= Sitneprotafib =

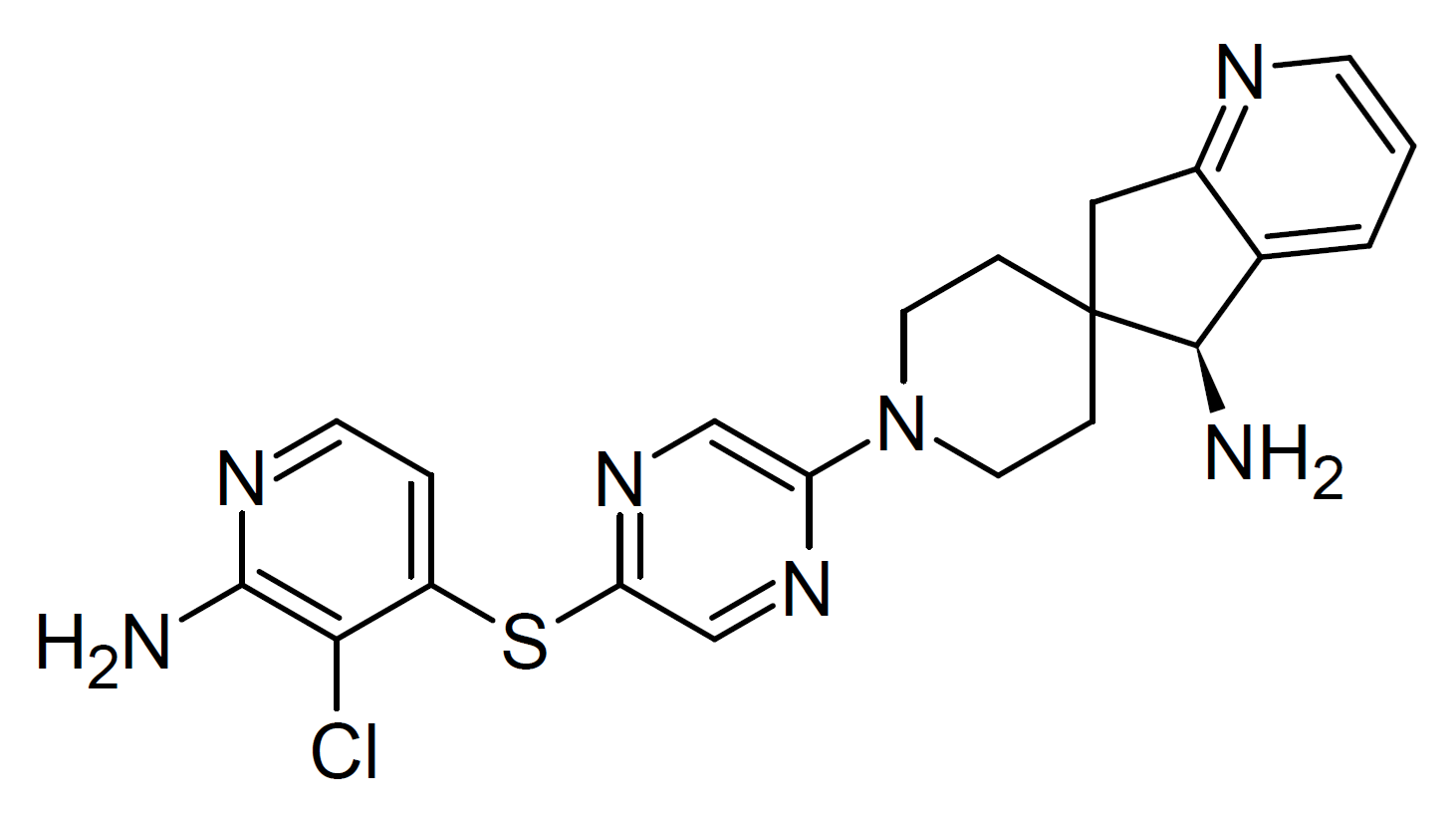

Clinical data
- Drug class: SHP2 inhibitor

Identifiers
- IUPAC name: (5S)-1'-[5-[(2-amino-3-chloro-4-pyridinyl)sulfanyl]pyrazin-2-yl]spiro[5,7-dihydrocyclopenta[b]pyridine-6,4'-piperidine]-5-amine
- CAS Number: 2245082-05-5
- PubChem CID: 142434183
- UNII: T21N67B1V3

Chemical and physical data
- Formula: C_{21}H_{22}ClN_{7}S
- Molar mass: 439.97 g·mol^{−1}
- 3D model (JSmol): Interactive image
- SMILES: C1CN(CCC12CC3=C([C@H]2N)C=CC=N3)C4=CN=C(C=N4)SC5=C(C(=NC=C5)N)Cl
- InChI: InChI=1S/C21H22ClN7S/c22-18-15(3-7-26-20(18)24)30-17-12-27-16(11-28-17)29-8-4-21(5-9-29)10-14-13(19(21)23)2-1-6-25-14/h1-3,6-7,11-12,19H,4-5,8-10,23H2,(H2,24,26)/t19-/m1/s1; Key:GKGIGIUNYOFYHZ-LJQANCHMSA-N

Sitneprotafib (JAB-3312) is a drug that acts as an inhibitor of the protein tyrosine phosphatase enzyme SHP-2 (PTPN11). It has been researched for the treatment of cancer and is in clinical trials as a combination treatment with glecirasib.
