= SHP099 =

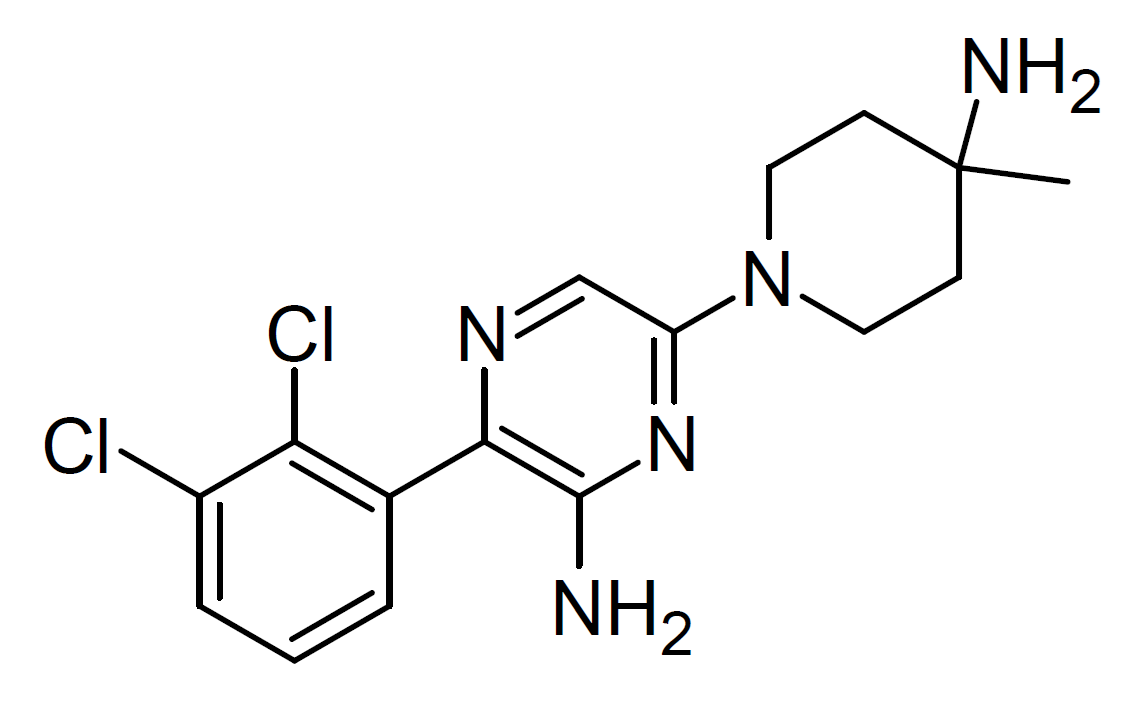

Clinical data
- Drug class: SHP2 inhibitor

Identifiers
- IUPAC name: 6-(4-amino-4-methylpiperidin-1-yl)-3-(2,3-dichlorophenyl)pyrazin-2-amine
- CAS Number: 1801747-42-1
- PubChem CID: 118238298
- ChemSpider: 58171740
- ChEMBL: ChEMBL4060033
- PDB ligand: 5OD (PDBe, RCSB PDB)

Chemical and physical data
- Formula: C_{16}H_{19}Cl_{2}N_{5}
- Molar mass: 352.26 g·mol^{−1}
- 3D model (JSmol): Interactive image
- SMILES: CC1(CCN(CC1)C2=CN=C(C(=N2)N)C3=C(C(=CC=C3)Cl)Cl)N
- InChI: InChI=1S/C16H19Cl2N5/c1-16(20)5-7-23(8-6-16)12-9-21-14(15(19)22-12)10-3-2-4-11(17)13(10)18/h2-4,9H,5-8,20H2,1H3,(H2,19,22); Key:YGUFCDOEKKVKJK-UHFFFAOYSA-N

SHP099 is a drug that acts as an inhibitor of the protein tyrosine phosphatase enzyme SHP-2 (PTPN11). It was developed as a potential agent for the treatment of cancer, but while it is potent, orally active and effective at inhibiting SHP-2 activity and slowing tumor growth, it was not developed for clinical use because of dose-limiting side effects. However it continues to be widely used in cancer research and a number of related derivatives have been developed. It has also been used to research the role of SHP-2 in other processes such as regulation of bone growth during development.

== See also ==
- SA-8
- Vociprotafib
