= SA8 =

SA8 may refer to:

- SA-8 Gecko, the NATO reporting name for the 9K33 Osa surface-to-air missile system
- SA8 (detergent), the brand of laundry detergent sold by Amway
- SA-8, a rocket launch used to launch mission AS-104, a test flight in the U.S. NASA Apollo Program moon project
- Stits SA-8 Skeeto, an ultralight aircraft
- post code SA8, a post code in Swansea, Wales, UK
- SA-8 (drug)

== See also ==
- Fiat SA8/75, a Fiat Aviazione aircraft engine
- SA (disambiguation)
