= Pulmonary artery stenosis =

Narrowing of the pulmonary artery

Stenosis of pulmonary artery
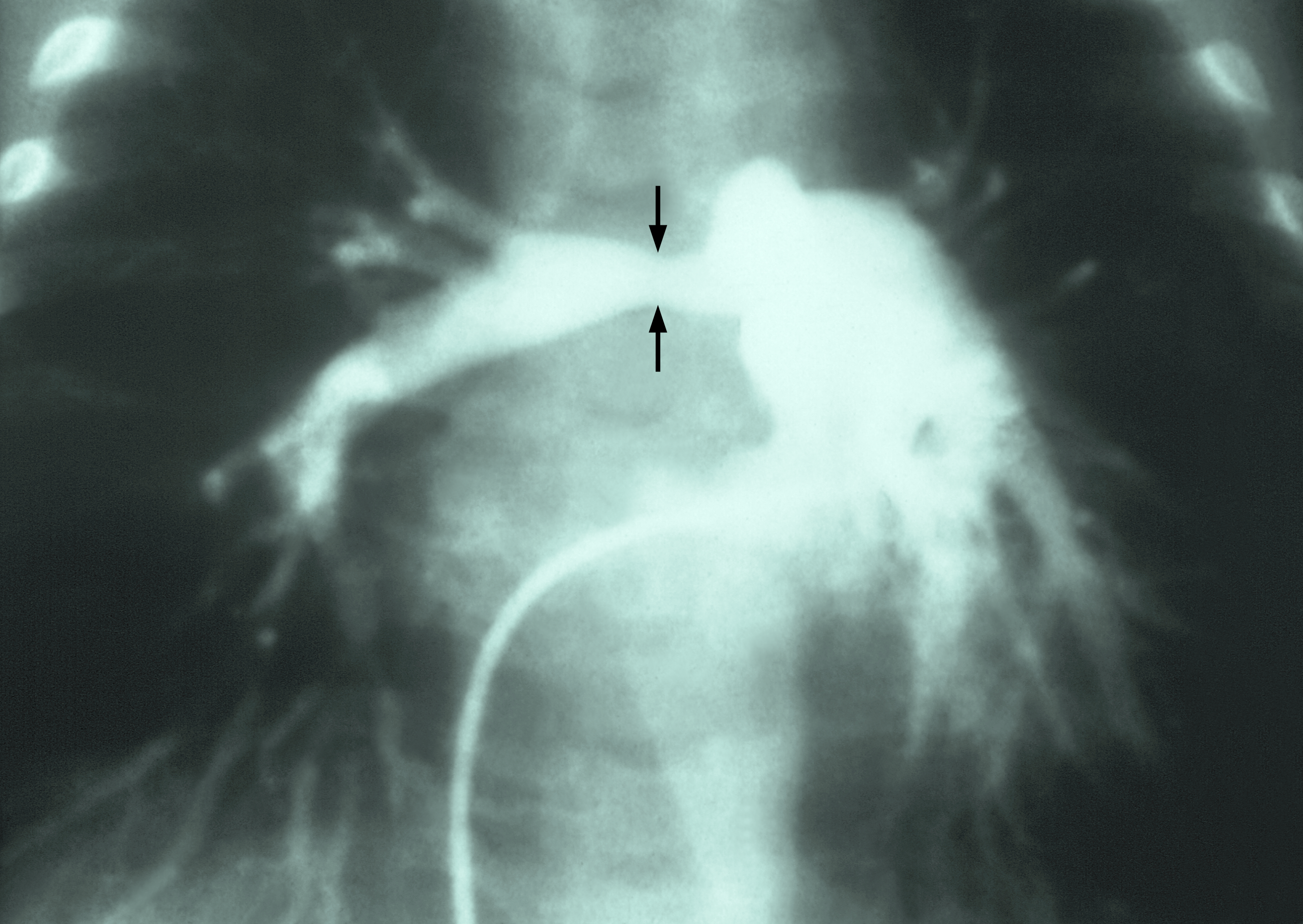
- Stenosis of the right pulmonary artery in a patient which was due to a case of congenital rubella.
- Specialty: Medical genetics

Pulmonary artery stenosis (PAS) is a narrowing of the pulmonary artery. The pulmonary artery is a blood vessel moving blood from the right side of the heart to the lungs. This narrowing can be due to many causes, including infection during pregnancy, a congenital heart defect, a problem with blood clotting in childhood or early adulthood, or a genetic change.

The narrowing can occur at many points along the pulmonary artery. The specific location indicates severity and affects treatment options. Most people with high-risk PAS are neonates, newborns, and young children. The more severe the disease the more likely it is to present with symptoms. With high-risk patients, it is necessary and acceptable to actively treat, to avoid worsening blood pressure, poor heart function, and worsening vessel disease across the body.

Blood flows in a methodical way through the body. Blood that has already delivered oxygen returns to the heart. It arrives at the right upper chamber, gets pumped though the tricuspid valve and into the lower right chamber. It travels through the pulmonary valve to the pulmonary artery and toward the lungs. Oxygenated blood returns to the left side of the heart before it is pumped throughout the body. When the pulmonary artery narrows, it increases blood pressure on the right side of the heart and causes the heart to work harder.

PAS is not the same as pulmonary valve stenosis. The pulmonary valve is the opening between the right heart and the pulmonary artery. Valve narrowing has similar effects. However, treatment is different. The long term consequences of each condition also vary and present with other comorbidities.

== Symptoms ==
Pulmonary artery stenosis symptoms depend on the location and cause of the narrowing. Common symptoms include:

- Shortness of breath
- Fatigue
- Rapid breathing (tachypnea)
- Elevated heart rate (tachycardia)

Other symptoms are caused by lack of oxygenated blood flow. This causes individuals to present with:

- Dizziness
- Loss of consciousness (brain not receiving enough oxygen and blood)
- Reduced physical activity
- Blueing of the lips, fingers, or toes (cyanosis)

When blood cannot reach the lungs because of the narrowing, blood can back up. This can lead to swelling in body parts such as the hands and feet and can present similarly to right sided heart failure.

== Causes ==
Although 40% of individuals have no other underlying heart problems, PAS can still occur in 2-3% of individuals with congenital heart disease:

- Tetralogy of Fallot: obstruction in blood leaving the right side of the heart, enlargement in the lower right chamber, an opening between the right and left lower chambers of the heart, and mispositioned aorta.
- Pulmonary atresia: pulmonary valve does not form, and blood is unable to travel from the right side of the heart to the lungs.
- Truncus arteriosus: one large vessel leaves the heart instead of two separate vessels, one from the right, one from the left.
- Aortic stenosis: narrowed left side valve
- Atrial septal defect: a hole between the right and left upper chambers allows blood from the left to enter the right.
- Ventricular septal defect: a hole between the right and left lower chambers allowing blood from the left, higher pressure side, to enter the right.
- Transposition of the great vessels: aorta and pulmonary artery swap where they receive blood from. Blood from the left side enters the pulmonary artery and goes to the lungs instead of the body while unoxygenated blood from the right side goes to the body.
- Patent ductus arteriosus: ductus arteriosus connects the pulmonary artery and aorta before and just after birth. In this condition the ductus does not shrink and close but remains open and causes extra blood to flow into the lungs and left side.

Genetic and infectious conditions:

- Williams syndrome and Alagille syndrome: mutation in the elastin gene resulting in an abnormality in pulmonary artery structure along with abnormalities in other organs
- Noonan syndrome: genetic mutation in a pathway regulating gene expression
- Ehlers–Danlos syndrome: mutation in collagen and other portions of connective tissue that make up body parts such as blood vessels
- Takayasu's arteritis: inflammatory disease results in damage, hardening, and occlusion to blood vessels leading to narrowing
- Rubella: infection during pregnancy that can lead to heart abnormalities in neonates

== Diagnosis ==
There is no immediate way to know if a child has PAS, but abnormal heart sounds, also known as murmurs, heard on physical exam, dictate further testing.

- Electrocardiogram (EKG): electrical recording of the heart that can show irregular heartbeats and changes in the heart muscle.
- Chest X-ray: shows shape and size of the heart and surrounding vessels.
- Echocardiogram: sound waves provide a real-time picture of the heart including the muscles, valves, and vessels.
- Computed Tomography (CT) Scan: a series of x-rays creates a detailed view of the heart and vessels. Using contrast dye can allow visualization of blood flow and narrowing.
- Cardiac Catheterization: inserting a catheter through a vessel into the heart.
- Pulmonary Angiogram: dye enhanced x-ray of the pulmonary arteries and veins.

== Treatment ==
The three treatments are balloon angioplasty, cutting balloon angioplasty, and stenting.

=== Balloon angioplasty ===
Balloon angioplasty expands the diameter of a vessel to counter narrowing. In this treatment a catheter with a balloon on the end is inserted into a larger, peripheral vessel and moved to the narrowing site. The goal is to tear two of the three layers of the artery, which increases the vessel's diameter and blood flow. A relatively stiff balloon achieves 72% efficacy with no risk increase.

After the procedure is performed, several factors help determine success. These are:

- evidence on imaging or tissue sampling of tearing of the vessel wall
- larger ratio of balloon diameter to vessel diameter
- cause of the stenosis (surgically-caused stenosis experiences more success)
- location of the narrowing, as vessels further from the heart are more elastic and more difficult to treat with balloon angioplasty.

The major reasons for simple balloon angioplasty failure are inability to tear the vessel wall, restenosis, and areas of narrowing due to compression by another body part rather than issues with the vessel itself. Even given evidence of vessel wall tearing, the rate of restenosis is between 15 and 44%. Studies reported that the rate of restenosis increases as time from the procedure increases. Rates of complications overall are estimated around 22%, including 10% higher risk complications. Other complications from this procedure are likely from too much vessel damage and include full vessel tears, deep vein thrombosis (clot in the vessel), complete artery rupture, and pulmonary edema.

Younger patients are typically treated with balloon angioplasty until they are older and the risk for metal stents is significantly reduced.

=== Cutting balloon angioplasty ===
Cutting balloon angioplasty was invented to help reduce vessel damage. This method utilizes balloons with a blade that can cut through vessel walls rather than simply causing vessel wall tearing via crushing/expansion of the balloon. When the balloon is not inflated the blades are protected inside the balloon folds, ensuring they will not accidentally damage other vessels. After the use of the cutting balloon, a larger, higher-pressure balloon can be used to improve efficacy. Multicenter studies reported the same safety profiles for simple versus cutting, with adverse effect rates of 2% and 3%, respectively. When a high-pressure balloon was used after cutting balloon angioplasty the rate of effectiveness increased from 52% to 85%. Cutting balloon angioplasty provides more areas of vessel damage especially in vessels further from the heart. Overall cutting balloon angioplasty has similar complications and restenosis rates as simple, but offers a more effective treatment, and is a better option for smaller areas.

=== Metal stents ===
To solve restenosis and external compression, metal stents were introduced. These stents are deployed via catheter. They are expanded at the site. The stents form a rigid structure that remain at the site. Newer studies reported successful dilation in 90% of patients on average, with newer studies indicating a 100% success rate. The benefits of stents is long term efficacy and the prevention of long term heart disease. Stents improved right side heart pressures, blood flow to the lungs, and pressure difference between the right and left sides. Stents can last up to 15 years, much longer than balloon angioplasty. Stents have the lowest rate of restenosis, at 2-3%.

Stents allow for normal vessel growth during childhood and adolescent years, and do not damage the heart or vasculature. 30-50% of young children required replacement with a larger stent in the first 2 years of placement. Complication rates are around 12% and include drift due to blood flow, which can damage vessels, clot formation on the stent. Because of these concerns and necessary removal of the stent if these were to occur, the stent must be monitored frequently after placement.

Another concern is fracturing, or breaking, due to repetitive pressure. Patients experience a 13% adverse event rate with major events such as a fracture at 1.2%. Studies reported that the adverse event rate decreased with patient age, likely due to less growth in the vessel. Replacement rates are as high as 43%, and increases over time.

=== History ===
Prior to the development of balloon angioplasty, surgical angioplasty was the main treatment method. Because of lack of efficacy, limited accessibility to certain areas of stenosis, increased risk for scarring, and a high rate of repeat stenosis, surgical angioplasty is only used if other methods fail or if surgeons observe the narrowing while repairing another defect. Some studies reported a 62% surgical success rate for surgical angioplasty. Alternative treatments would be required for 4/10 patients while exposing them to risks of surgery.

Initially a soft balloon was used, but only about 60% of patients experienced even a 50% increase in blood flow. This efficacy was similar to surgical angioplasty with a large risk reduction. Later, a stiffer balloon achieved better results,
