= Valve stenosis =

Valve stenosis may refer to:

- Pulmonary valve stenosis
- Aortic valve stenosis
- Mitral valve stenosis
