= Cardiofaciocutaneous syndrome =

- Cardiofaciocutaneous syndrome is inherited in an autosomal dominant manner
- Specialty: Medical genetics
- Differential diagnosis: Costello syndrome Ectodermal dysplasia Noonan syndrome Noonan syndrome-like disorder with loose anagen hair

Cardiofaciocutaneous (CFC) syndrome is an extremely rare genetic disorder, and is one of the RASopathies. It was first described in 1986.

It is characterized by the following:

- Distinctive facial appearance
- Unusually sparse, brittle, curly scalp hair
- A range of skin abnormalities from dermatitis to thick, scaly skin over the entire body (generalized ichthyosis)
- Heart malformations in over 75% of patients (congenital or appearing later), especially an obstruction of the normal flow of blood from the lower right ventricle of the heart to the lungs (valvar pulmonary stenosis)
- Growth delays
- Feeding problems associated with severe gastroesophageal reflux disease (GERD)
- Foot abnormalities (extra toe or fusion of two or more toes)
- Intellectual disability
- Failure to thrive

== Presentation ==
=== Head ===
Individuals with the disorder usually have distinctive malformations of the craniofacial area including an unusually large head (macrocephaly), prominent forehead, and abnormal narrowing of both sides of the forehead (bitemporal constriction); The nose can be upturned and short with a low nasal bridge; and large ears that are abnormally rotated toward the back of the head. In many cases, affected individuals also have downward slanting eyelid folds, widely spaced eyes, drooping of the upper eyelids, inward deviation of the eyes, and other eye abnormalities including absent eyebrows and eyelashes.

== Genetic ==
Costello and Noonan syndrome are similar to CFC and their phenotypic overlap may be due to the biochemical relationship of the genes mutated in each syndrome. Genes that are mutated in all three of these syndromes encode proteins that function in the MAP kinase pathway.

- Mutations that cause CFC are found in the KRAS, BRAF, MEK1, and MEK2 genes.
- Costello syndrome is caused by mutations in HRAS.
- Mutations that cause Noonan syndrome have been found in PTPN11 and SOS1.

The relative severity of CFC when compared to Noonan syndrome may reflect the position in the biochemical pathway occupied by the affected genes.

- Shp2, the protein product of the PTPN11 gene, appears to regulate the MAP kinase pathway at or above the level of SOS1.
- SOS1 in turn regulates the activities of RAS, RAF, MEK, ERK, and p90RSK.
- SOS1 has been demonstrated to be a target of negative feedback by ERK and p90RSK.

Thus, any activating mutation downstream of SOS1 may be subject to less regulation that might mitigate the consequence of such mutations, giving rise to the phenotypic differences seen between these syndromes.
