= Batoprotafib =

Identifiers
- IUPAC name: (3S,4S)-8-[6-amino-5-(2-amino-3-chloropyridin-4-yl)sulfanylpyrazin-2-yl]-3-methyl-2-oxa-8-azaspiro[4.5]decan-4-amine
- CAS Number: 1801765-04-7
- PubChem CID: 118238370
- IUPHAR/BPS: 12068
- DrugBank: DB19137
- ChemSpider: 92169534
- UNII: FPJWORQEGI
- ChEMBL: ChEMBL4650521
- PDB ligand: VKS (PDBe, RCSB PDB)

Chemical and physical data
- Formula: C_{18}H_{24}ClN_{7}OS
- Molar mass: 421.95 g·mol^{−1}
- 3D model (JSmol): Interactive image
- SMILES: C[C@H]1[C@H](C2(CCN(CC2)C3=CN=C(C(=N3)N)SC4=C(C(=NC=C4)N)Cl)CO1)N
- InChI: InChI=1S/C18H24ClN7OS/c1-10-14(20)18(9-27-10)3-6-26(7-4-18)12-8-24-17(16(22)25-12)28-11-2-5-23-15(21)13(11)19/h2,5,8,10,14H,3-4,6-7,9,20H2,1H3,(H2,21,23)(H2,22,25)/t10-,14+/m0/s1; Key:UCJZOKGUEJUNIO-IINYFYTJSA-N

Batoprotafib (TNO155) is an experimental drug which acts as a selective inhibitor of the protein tyrosine phosphatase enzyme SHP2, which regulates cell growth and differentiation through the MAPK signaling pathway. It is in early stage clinical trials against lung cancer, squamous cell carcinoma and peripheral nerve sheath tumors.
