= Costello syndrome =

- Other names: Faciocutaneoskeletal syndrome
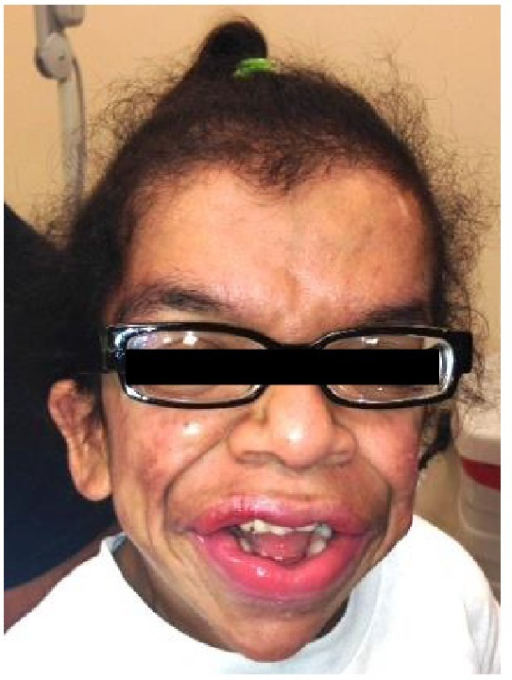
- The facial features of a teenager with Costello syndrome.
- Specialty: Medical genetics
- Frequency: 0.0001%

Costello syndrome, also called faciocutaneoskeletal syndrome or FCS syndrome, is a rare genetic disorder that affects many parts of the body. It is characterized by delayed development and intellectual disabilities, distinctive facial features, unusually flexible joints, and loose folds of extra skin, especially on the hands and feet. Heart abnormalities are common, including a very fast heartbeat (tachycardia), structural heart defects, and overgrowth of the heart muscle (hypertrophic cardiomyopathy). Infants with Costello syndrome may be large at birth, but grow more slowly than other children and have difficulty feeding. Later in life, people with this condition have relatively short stature and many have reduced levels of growth hormones. It is a RASopathy.

Beginning in early childhood, people with specific mutations on the Costello syndrome gene variant have an increased risk of developing certain cancerous and noncancerous tumors. Small growths called papillomas are the most common noncancerous tumors seen with this condition. They usually develop around the nose and mouth. The most frequent cancerous tumor associated with Costello syndrome is a soft tissue tumor called a rhabdomyosarcoma. Other cancers also have been reported in children and adolescents with this disorder, including a tumor that arises in developing nerve cells (neuroblastoma) and a form of bladder cancer (transitional cell carcinoma).

Costello syndrome was discovered by Jack Costello, a New Zealand paediatrician, in 1977. He is credited with first reporting the syndrome in the Australian Paediatric Journal, Volume 13, No.2 in 1977.

== Signs and symptoms ==
This condition is characterized by delayed development and intellectual disability, loose folds of skin (which are especially noticeable on the hands and feet), unusually flexible joints, and distinctive facial features including a large mouth with full lips. Others also include heart abnormalities. Infants born with this condition may be large at birth, but grow more slowly than other children and have difficulty feeding. Later in life, people with this condition have relatively short stature and many have reduced levels of growth hormones.

== Genetics ==
Costello syndrome is caused by any of at least five different mutations in the HRAS gene on chromosome 11. This gene provides instructions for making a protein, H-Ras, that helps control cell growth and division. Mutations that cause Costello syndrome lead to the production of an H-Ras protein that is permanently active. Instead of triggering cell growth in response to particular signals from outside the cell, the overactive protein directs cells to grow and divide constantly. This unchecked cell division may predispose those affected to the development of benign and malignant tumors. It remains unclear how mutations in HRAS cause other features of Costello syndrome, but many of the signs and symptoms may result from cell overgrowth and abnormal cell division.

HRAS is a proto-oncogene in which somatic mutations in healthy people can contribute to cancer. Whereas children with Costello syndrome typically have a mutation in HRAS in every cell of their bodies, an otherwise healthy person with a tumor caused in part by HRAS mutation will only have mutant HRAS within the tumor. The test for the mutation in cancer tumors can also be used to test children for Costello syndrome.

Costello syndrome is inherited in an autosomal dominant manner, which means one copy of the altered gene is sufficient to cause the disorder. Almost all cases have resulted from new mutations, and occur in people with no history of the disorder in their family. This condition is rare; as of 20 April 2007, 200 to 300 cases have been reported worldwide.

== Diagnosis ==
Costello Syndrome can be difficult for doctors to immediately clinically diagnose, as there are similar conditions that resemble this syndrome. This condition is usually diagnosed in childhood, and the assessment starts by assessing the child's height, the size of the head, and birth weight.. In suspected prenatal cases, sonography is performed to look for polyhydramnios, increased nuchal thickness, ulnar deviation of the wrists, and decreased length of the femur and humeri.

Full genome and Exome next generation DNA testing is the primary diagnostic tool for Costello Syndrome.

== Treatments ==
Treatment solely addresses symptoms as there’s no cure for the genetic Costello Syndrome. Children with the condition are recommended regular ultrasound screening to detect tumours early.

There are ideas for future treatment possibilities that some families of affected persons hope might help. They include farnesyltransferase inhibitors (FTIs) affecting H-Ras, a treatment devised for children affected by the genetic disorder progeria, the use of Lovastatin, a proposed but unlicensed treatment for neurofibromatosis type I and the use of a MEK inhibitor that helps inhibit the pathway closer to the cell nucleus. None of these have entered clinical trials for the use in Costello Syndrome cases.

== Research ==
Spanish researchers reported the development of a Costello mouse, with the G12V mutation, in early 2008. Although the G12V mutation is rare among children with Costello syndrome, and the G12V mouse does not appear to develop tumors as expected, information about the mouse model's heart may be transferable to humans.

Italian and Japanese researchers published their development of a Costello zebrafish in late 2008, also with the G12V mutation. The advent of animal models may accelerate identification of treatment options.

== Historical ==
That genetic mutations in HRAS cause Costello syndrome was first reported in 2005. These mutations, along with mutations that cause cardiofaciocutaneous syndrome, found soon after, surprised geneticists and changed how genetic syndromes can be grouped. Before this, geneticists looked for new mutations in genes with mutations that caused syndromes similar to the unknown syndrome. For example, researchers looked at and around the most common Noonan syndrome mutation, PTPN11, but did not find anything related to Costello syndrome or cardiofaciocutaneous syndrome. The first mutation that is now identified as one of the Costello syndrome alleles was found unexpectedly when Japanese researchers used the DNA of children with Costello syndrome as a control, looking for another Noonan gene

Geneticists realized that the syndromes they were grouping together clinically according to their signs and symptoms were related in a way they had never realized: the mutations that cause Costello syndrome, Noonan syndrome and cardiofaciocutaneous syndromes are linked by their cellular function, not by being on or close to a gene with a known mutation. The cellular function that links them is a common signalling pathway that brings information from outside the cell to the nucleus. This pathway is called the Ras-MAP-kinase signal transduction pathway (Ras-MAPK Pathway).
