= SA-8 (drug) =

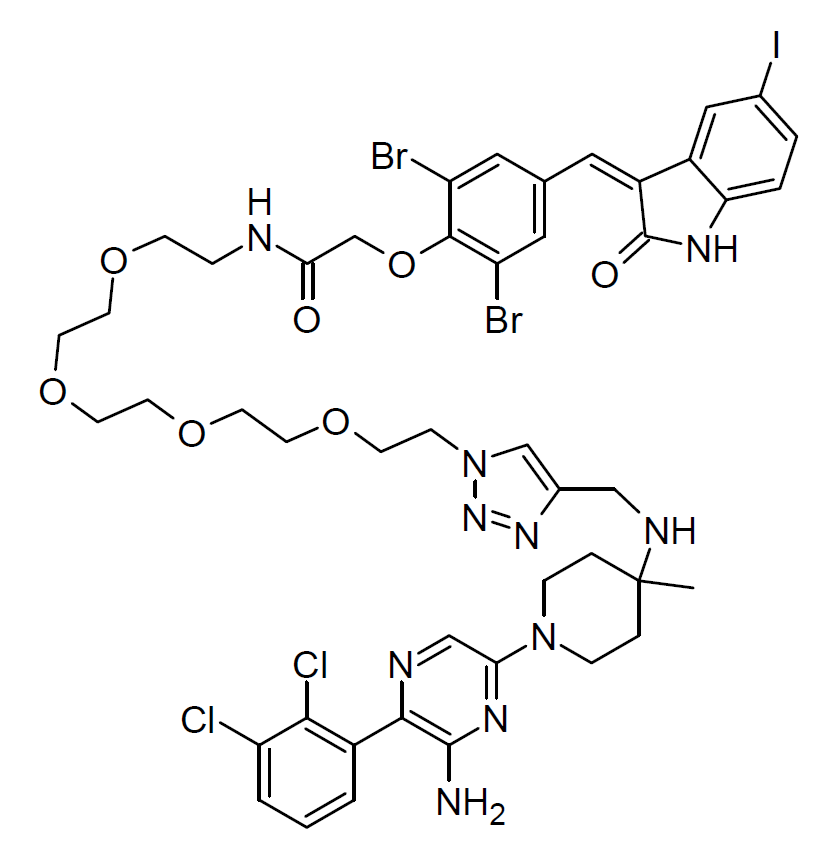

Clinical data
- Drug class: SHP2 targeting AUTAC

Identifiers
- ChemSpider: 133321345

Chemical and physical data
- Formula: C_{46}H_{51}Br_{2}Cl_{2}IN_{10}O_{7}
- Molar mass: 1213.59 g·mol^{−1}
- 3D model (JSmol): Interactive image
- SMILES: O=C\1Nc2ccc(I)cc2/C/1=C/c1cc(Br)c(OCC(=O)NCCOCCOCCOCCOCCn2nnc(c2)CNC2(C)CCN(CC2)c2nc(N)c(nc2)c2cccc(Cl)c2Cl)c(Br)c1
- InChI: InChI=InChI=1S/C46H51Br2Cl2IN10O7/c1-46(7-10-60(11-8-46)39-26-54-42(44(52)57-39)32-3-2-4-37(49)41(32)50)55-25-31-27-61(59-58-31)12-14-65-16-18-67-20-19-66-17-15-64-13-9-53-40(62)28-68-43-35(47)22-29(23-36(43)48)21-34-33-24-30(51)5-6-38(33)56-45(34)63/h2-6,21-24,26-27,55H,7-20,25,28H2,1H3,(H2,52,57)(H,53,62)(H,56,63)/b34-21-; Key:LPVCESFXKLMSMS-ZXSNDDASSA-N

SA-8 is a drug that acts as an AUTAC selective for the protein tyrosine phosphatase enzyme SHP-2 (PTPN11), acting to target this protein for destruction by cell maintenance enzymes. This is a similar approach to older PROTAC drugs which target unwanted proteins for destruction by proteasomes, but AUTACs instead target unwanted proteins for destruction by autophagosomes, which allows for targeting of proteins in cells and tissue types where PROTACs would not be effective. SA-8 was derived from an older drug SHP099 which acts as an SHP-2 inhibitor. It has been investigated for treatment of various forms of cancer, and while it is unlikely to be developed for clinical use in humans itself, SA-8 represents an important proof of concept of the AUTAC approach which is likely to lead to the development of related compounds for medical use.
