= PTPN22 =

Protein-coding gene in humans

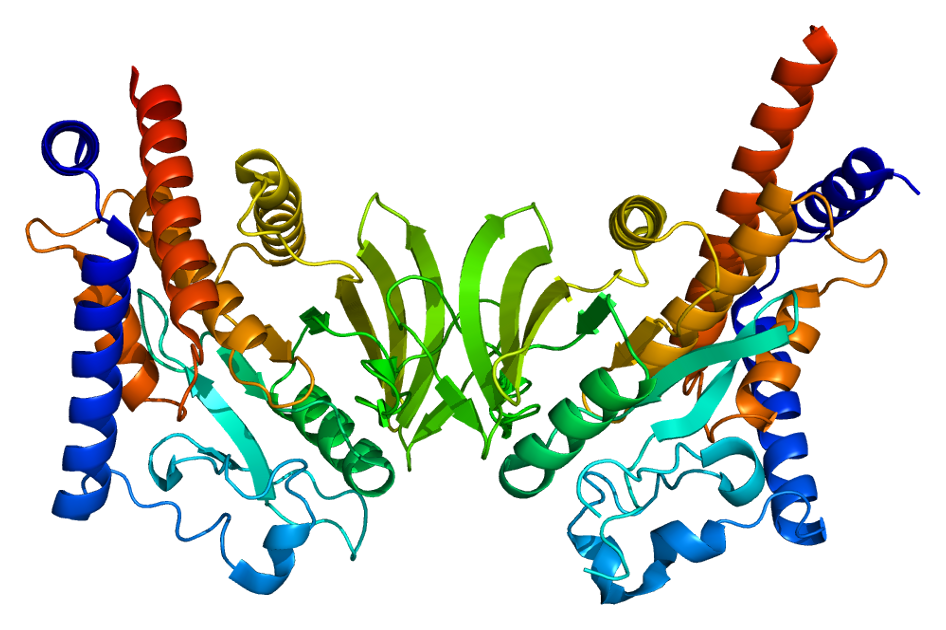

Identifiers
- Aliases: PTPN22, protein tyrosine phosphatase, non-receptor type 22 (lymphoid), LYP, LYP1, LYP2, PEP, PTPN8, protein tyrosine phosphatase, non-receptor type 22, PTPN22.6, PTPN22.5, protein tyrosine phosphatase non-receptor type 22
- External IDs: OMIM: 600716; MGI: 107170; GeneCards: PTPN22
Available structures
PDB	Ortholog search: PDBe RCSB
PDB	List of PDB id codes 2P6X, 2QCJ, 2QCT, 3BRH, 3H2X, 3OLR, 3OMH, 4J51
Enzyme activity
EC #	BRENDA	ExPASy	KEGG	MetaCyc
3.1.3.48	↗	↗	↗	↗

Gene location (Human)
Chr.	Chromosome 1 (human)
Band	1p13.2	Start	113,813,811 bp
Band	1p13.2	End	113,871,753 bp

Gene location (Mouse)
Chr.	Chromosome 3 (mouse)
Band	3|3 F2.2	Start	103,767,111 bp
Band	3|3 F2.2	End	103,819,563 bp
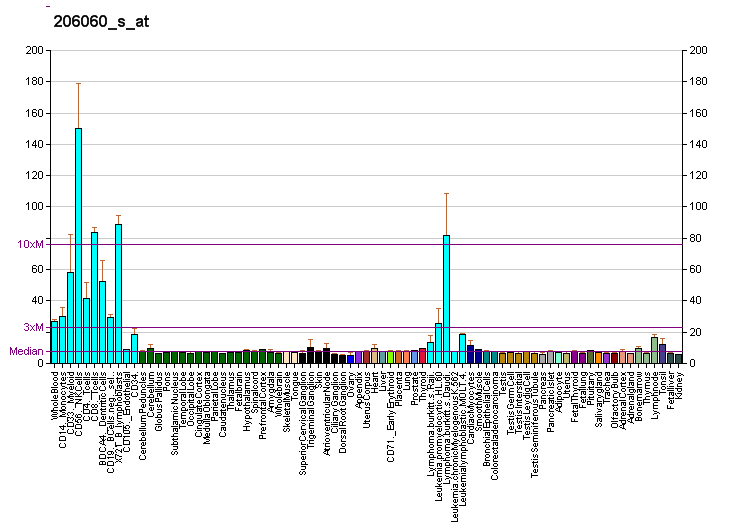

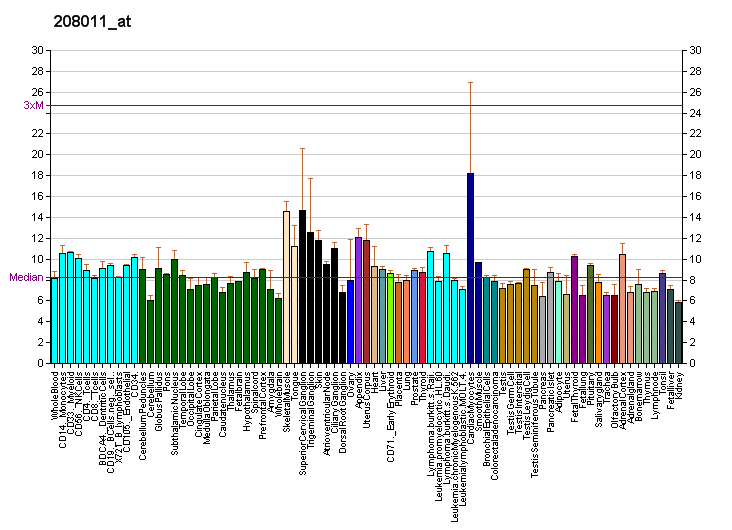

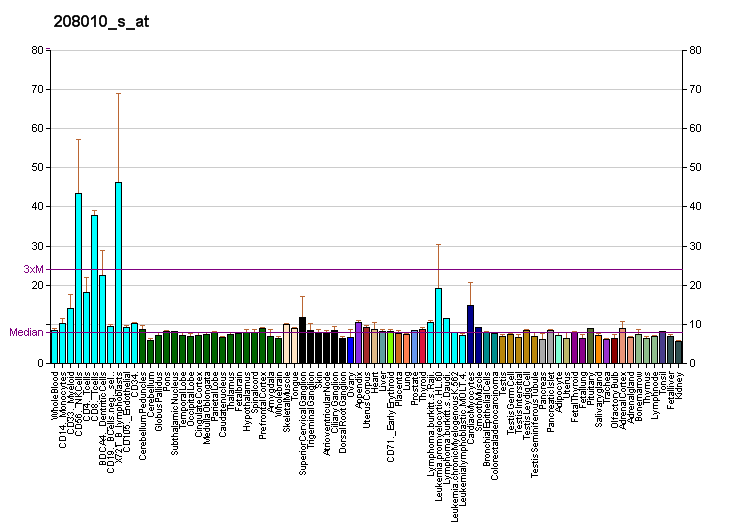
RNA expression pattern
Bgee	Human / Mouse (ortholog); Top expressed in: bone marrow cell; monocyte; granulocyte; buccal mucosa cell; blood; Achilles tendon; superficial temporal artery; lymph node; epithelium of nasopharynx; spleen / Top expressed in: thymus; spleen; granulocyte; lymph node; mesenteric lymph nodes; zygote; blood; secondary oocyte; primary oocyte; morula; More reference expression data
BioGPS	More reference expression data
Gene ontology
Molecular function	phosphoprotein phosphatase activity; SH3 domain binding; phosphatase activity; kinase binding; protein binding; hydrolase activity; ubiquitin protein ligase binding; protein tyrosine phosphatase activity
Cellular component	cytoplasm; perinuclear region of cytoplasm; cytoplasmic side of plasma membrane; nucleus; cytosol
Biological process	positive regulation of protein K63-linked ubiquitination; regulation of NIK/NF-kappaB signaling; regulation of innate immune response; regulation of natural killer cell proliferation; positive regulation of toll-like receptor 3 signaling pathway; regulation of T cell receptor signaling pathway; regulation of B cell receptor signaling pathway; phosphoanandamide dephosphorylation; immune system process; negative regulation of nucleotide-binding oligomerization domain containing 2 signaling pathway; negative regulation of p38MAPK cascade; protein dephosphorylation; negative regulation of gene expression; negative regulation of T cell receptor signaling pathway; cellular response to muramyl dipeptide; autophagy; response to lipopolysaccharide; T cell differentiation; positive regulation of gene expression; positive regulation of ERK1 and ERK2 cascade; positive regulation of toll-like receptor 4 signaling pathway; negative regulation of tumor necrosis factor production; negative regulation of autophagy; negative regulation of JUN kinase activity; negative regulation of T cell activation; positive regulation of type I interferon production; lipopolysaccharide-mediated signaling pathway; dephosphorylation; peptidyl-tyrosine dephosphorylation; T cell receptor signaling pathway
Sources:Amigo / QuickGO
Orthologs
Databases	NCBI: entry; OMA: entry
Species	Human	Mouse
Entrez	26191	19260
Ensembl	ENSG00000134242	ENSMUSG00000027843
UniProt	Q9Y2R2	P29352
RefSeq (mRNA)	NM_001193431; NM_001308297; NM_012411; NM_015967	NM_008979
RefSeq (protein)	NP_001180360; NP_001295226; NP_036543; NP_057051	NP_033005
Location (UCSC)	Chr 1: 113.81 – 113.87 Mb	Chr 3: 103.77 – 103.82 Mb
PubMed search
- Wikidata
View/Edit Human	View/Edit Mouse

Protein tyrosine phosphatase non-receptor type 22 is a cytoplasmatic protein encoded by gene PTPN22 and a member of PEST family of protein tyrosine phosphatases. This protein is also called "PEST-domain Enriched Phosphatase" ("PEP") or "Lymphoid phosphatase" ("LYP"). The name LYP is used strictly for the human protein encoded by PTPN22, but the name PEP is used only for its mouse homolog. However, both proteins have similar biological functions and show 70% identity in amino acid sequence. PTPN22 functions as a negative regulator of T cell receptor (TCR) signaling, which maintains homeostasis of T cell compartment.

== Gene ==
Gene PTPN22 is located on the p arm of the human chromosome 1. It is nearly 58,000 base pairs long and contains 21 exons. In the case of mouse genome, it is located on the q arm of the chromosome 3. It is nearly 55,700 base pairs long and contains 23 exons.

== Structure ==
PTPN22 is composed from 807 amino acids, and it weighs 91,705 kDa. On its N terminus it possesses catalytic domain, which shows the highest level of conservation between human and mouse proteins. Other parts of PTPN22 are less conserved. After catalytic domain PTPN22 has approximately 300 amino acids long domain called "Interdomain". On the C terminus of PTPN22 there are 4 proline-rich motifs (P1 - P4), which can mediate interactions with other proteins. P1 motif is the most important among them, because it is crucial for binding of CSK kinase, and allele encoding PTPN22 with mutated P1 motif is associated with increased risk of numerous autoimmune diseases.

== Function ==
=== Regulation of T cell receptor signaling ===
A T cell receptor activation by a cognate peptide triggers a signaling pathway activating a T cell. The first event of this pathway is activation of the SRC family kinase LCK by a dephosphorylation of its C terminal inhibition tyrosine (Y505) and by a phosphorylation of its activation tyrosine (Y394). LCK then phosphorylate tyrosines in the CD3 complex creating a docking site for the SH2 domain of the SYK family kinase ZAP70, which is there phosphorylated too. The Phosphorylated ZAP70 then propagate a signal from a TCR, phosphorylating other proteins and creating a multi-protein complex, which activates downstream signaling pathways. PTPN22 possess the ability to dephosphorylate proteins included in proximal events of the TCR signaling and serves as an important negative regulator of a T cell activation. PTPN22 is able to bind the LCK with phosphorylated Y394, the phosphorylated ZAP70 and the phosphorylated ζ chain of CD3 complex. Thus, it binds molecules of a proximal TCR signaling only after their activation. PTPN22 can dephosphorylate those proteins and decrease the activating signal obtained by a T cell. Dephosphorylation of kinases LCK and ZAP70 by a PTPN22 is specific concerning the phosphorylated tyrosine in those proteins – only the Y394 of LCK and the Y493 of ZAP70 are dephosphorylated. In the absence of PTPN22, an activated T cell receive a stronger activation signal, which is reflected by a greater influx of Ca^{2+} cations into the cytosol, bigger phosphorylation of an LCK, ZAP70 and ERK and larger expansion of those cells. The inhibitory effect on a TCR signaling was also verified with the usage of PTPN22 inhibitor on a Jurkat T cell line and on human primary T cells, and also with the experiments of PTPN22 overexpression in vitro. The expression of PTPN22 is upregulated after an activation of T cells and an antigen-experienced T cell have higher expression of PTPN22 than a naive T cell.

The regulatory function of PTPN22 is particularly important during an activation by low affinity peptides. In the absence of PTPN22, T cell cannot discriminate between strong and weak antigens sufficiently and those T cells become more responsive, which can be detected like increased upregulation of transcription factors and CD69, increased ERK phosphorylation, increased ability to expand in vivo and to produce cytokines. Increased responsiveness can also break the tolerance against low affinity self-antigens and is well visible, when PTPN22-deficient T cells get into a lymphopenic environment.

=== Regulation of regulatory T cells ===
One particular population of T cells, which is influenced by a PTPN22 deficiency is the population of regulatory T cells (Treg cells). PTPN22-deficient mice contain higher amount of Treg cells in lymph nodes and spleens and this difference is more visible with increasing age of mice. There is also a change of the effector Treg cells : central Treg cells ratio in favor of the effector Treg cells. PTPN22 deficiency increases abilities of Treg cells to survive, differentiation of Treg cells from naive T cells, but not the ability to proliferate in vivo, and it also supports transition of central Treg cells to effector Treg cells. One of the reasons, of the increased survival of PTPN22-deficient Treg cells, is that those cells have upregulated expression of GITR, which increases their expansion in vivo. Treatment of PTPN22-deficient mice with an anti-GITR-L blocking antibody suppresses the expansion of Treg cells. PTPN22 deficiency does not impair the suppressive function of Treg cells. Actually there are some articles suggesting that PTPN22-deficient Treg cells possess an enhanced suppressive function or have a bigger ability to obtain an effector phenotype.

=== Regulation of adhesiveness and motility ===
Next to a TCR signaling PTPN22 regulates an adhesiveness and a motility of T cells. PTPN22-deficient T cells have a prolonged interval of contact with an antigen presenting cell, which present a low affinity peptide. With a high affinity peptide the difference is not detectable. Part of the reason of the increased adhesiveness of those T cells is that enhanced TCR signaling results in a higher activation of the RAP1 and a boosted inside-out signaling to activate the adhesive molecule LFA-1. In migrating T cells we can see the polarized localization of the PTPN22 at the leading edge of a migrating T cell, where it colocalizes with its substrates LCK and ZAP70. A downregulation of the PTPN22 increases motility, adhesivity and levels of phosphorylated LCK and phosphorylated ZAP70 in those cells. On the contrary, an overexpression of the PTPN22, but not the catalytically inactive PTPN22, increases motility of migrating T cells. An association of the PTPN22, but not its disease associated mutant form, with the LFA-1 results in a decreased LFA-1 clustering and a decreased adhesion. The role of the PTPN22 in the regulation of LFA-1-mediated adhesion and motility is also supported by the observation of increased LFA-1 expression in PTPN22^{-/-} Treg cells.

=== Interaction partners ===
The C-terminal part of the PTPN22 bare proline-rich motifs providing binding sites for putative interaction partners. One of those interaction partners is the cytoplasmatic tyrosine kinase CSK, which is a negative regulator of SRC family kinases and a TCR signaling as well as the PTPN22. CSK binds two prolin-rich motifs (P1 and P2) in the structure of PTPN22 through its SH3 domain and the P1 motif is more important in this interaction. A deletion of the P1 motif greatly diminish the inhibitory effect of the PTPN22 on a TCR signaling. The Interaction of those enzymes is needed for their optimal function and the inhibition of TCR signaling. It was also proposed that the interaction of PTPN22 and CSK regulate a localization of the PTPN22 and a dissociation of this complex enables translocation of the PTPN22 to lipid rafts of a plasma membrane, where it can inhibit a TCR signaling. The mutant PTPN22, which is unable to bind CSK, is effectively recruited to a plasma membrane.

Another interaction partner of the PTPN22 is TRAF3. This protein bind the PTPN22 and regulate its translocalization to a plasma membrane, in the absence of TRAF3 there is a bigger amount of the PTPN22 localized at a plasma membrane.

== Regulation of PTPN22 ==
It was revealed that PTPN22 is regulated by a phosphorylation. PTPN22 is phosphorylated on the serine in the position 751 by the protein PKC (most probably isoform PKCα) after activation of a T cell. This phosphorylation negatively regulates the TCR-suppressing function of the PTPN22. It also suppresses the polyubiquitination of PTPN22, which targets this protein for degradation, and by this mean, it prolongs half-life of the PTPN22. Phosphorylared PTPN22 interacts better with the CSK which hold PTPN22 away from a plasma membrane, where it can dephosphorylate proteins of a TCR signaling pathway. PTPN22 with the mutated serine 751 has shorter half-life, enhanced recruitment to plasma membrane and reduced interaction with CSK.

== PTPN22-deficient mice ==
Young PTPN22-deficient mice do not display any abnormality in peripheral lymphoid organs, but older PTPN22-deficient mice (older than 6 months) develop a splenomegaly and a lymphadenopathy. In these older mice we can see an increased number of the T cells with phenotype of the effector/memory T cells (CD44^{hi}, CD62L^{lo}), which have higher expression of the PTPN22 than naive T cells in Wild Type mice. The expansion of those T cells is supported by the PTPN22 deficiency. A compartment of Treg cell is also influenced by the PTPN22 deficiency in vivo. Same as with the effector/memory T cells, PTPN22-deficient mice contain a bigger amount of Treg cells in lymph nodes and spleens and this difference is more visible with increasing age of mice. There is also a change of the effector Treg cells : central Treg cells ratio in favor of the effector Treg cells. Influence of the PTPN22 deficiency on Treg cells number is consistent with the higher expression of PTPN22 in Treg cells than in naive T cells. Another abnormality of PTPN22-deficient mice is a spontaneous formation of large germinal centers in spleens and peyer's patches. This formation of germinal centers is dependent on the costimulation molecule CD40L and it is another consequence of the T cell dysregulation. PTPN22-deficient mice have increased levels of antibodies. However, there is no increase in levels of autoantibodies. Despite those effects of the PTPN22 deficiency on a T cell compartment and an antibody production, PTPN22-deficient mice do not show signs of any autoimmune disease.

== Disease associated variant of PTPN22 ==
In 2004, Bottini et al. discovered the single-nucleotide polymorphism in the PTPN22 gene at nucleotide 1858. In this variant of the gene, normally occurring cytosine is substituted by thymine (C1858T). This cytosine encodes the codon for an amino acid arginine in the position 620 of the linear protein structure, but the mutation to thymine cause change of an arginine to a tryptophan (R620W). The amino acid 620 is placed in the P1 motif, which is involved in the association with CSK and the mutation to tryptophan diminish the ability of the PTPN22 to bind CSK. The article reporting the existence of this variant also discovered that it is more frequent in Diabetes mellitus type 1 patients. The association of C1858T allele with type 1 diabetes was then confirmed by other studies. In addition, C1858T allele of PTPN22 is associated with other autoimmune diseases including rheumatoid arthritis, systemic lupus erythematosus, juvenile idiopathic arthritis, anti-neutrophil cytoplasmic antibody (ANCA)-associated vasculitis, Graves' disease, myasthenia gravis, Addison's disease. The contribution of the C1858T PTPN22 allele to those diseases was confirmed by more robust meta-analysis. On the other hand, this allele is not linked to autoimmune diseases like multiple sclerosis, ulcerative colitis, pephigus vulgaris and others. The exact way how the function of the PTPN22 is influenced by this mutation is still unknown. Throughout past years there were appearing evidences supporting that C1858T mutation is a loss-of-function mutation, but also evidences supporting that it is a gain-of-function mutation.
