= SHOC2 =

Identifiers
- Aliases: SHOC2, SIAA0862, SOC2, SUR8, SHOC2 leucine-rich repeat scaffold protein, leucine rich repeat scaffold protein, SHOC2 leucine rich repeat scaffold protein, NSLH1
- External IDs: OMIM: 602775; MGI: 1927197; GeneCards: SHOC2

Gene location (Human)
Chr.	Chromosome 10 (human)
Band	10q25.2	Start	110,919,367 bp
Band	10q25.2	End	111,017,307 bp

Gene location (Mouse)
Chr.	Chromosome 19 (mouse)
Band	19|19 D2	Start	53,932,737 bp
Band	19|19 D2	End	54,021,564 bp
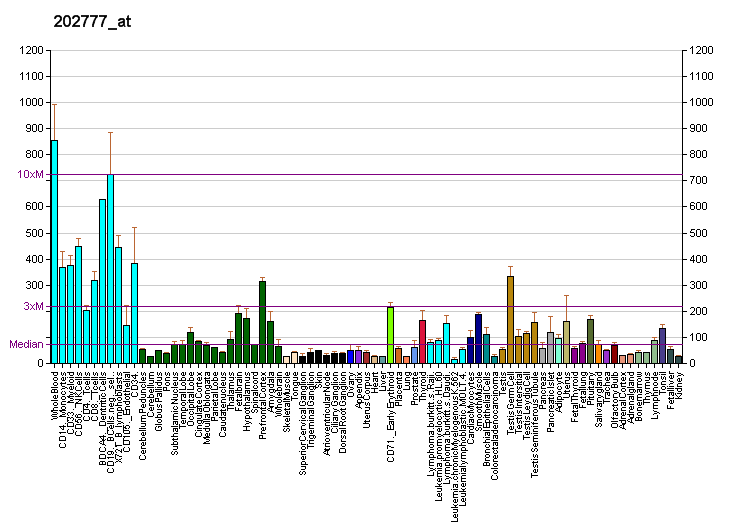
RNA expression pattern
Bgee	Human / Mouse (ortholog); Top expressed in: Achilles tendon; sural nerve; bone marrow; epithelium of colon; bone marrow cell; tail of epididymis; testicle; corpus epididymis; jejunal mucosa; caput epididymis / Top expressed in: genital tubercle; ascending aorta; aortic valve; pineal gland; tail of embryo; superior cervical ganglion; dorsomedial hypothalamic nucleus; pyloric antrum; renal corpuscle; hair follicle; More reference expression data
BioGPS	More reference expression data
Gene ontology
Molecular function	protein phosphatase 1 binding; protein phosphatase regulator activity; protein phosphatase binding; protein binding; protein serine/threonine phosphatase activity
Cellular component	protein phosphatase type 1 complex; nucleoplasm; nucleus; cytoplasm; cytosol; plasma membrane; photoreceptor inner segment; photoreceptor outer segment membrane
Biological process	fibroblast growth factor receptor signaling pathway; positive regulation of Ras protein signal transduction; Ras protein signal transduction; regulation of phosphoprotein phosphatase activity; protein dephosphorylation
Sources:Amigo / QuickGO
Orthologs
Databases	NCBI: entry; OMA: entry
Species	Human	Mouse
Entrez	8036	56392
Ensembl	ENSG00000108061	ENSMUSG00000024976
UniProt	Q9UQ13	O88520
RefSeq (mRNA)	NM_001269039; NM_007373; NM_001324336; NM_001324337	NM_001168505; NM_019658; NM_001355242
RefSeq (protein)	NP_001255968; NP_001311265; NP_001311266; NP_031399	NP_001161977; NP_062632; NP_001342171
Location (UCSC)	Chr 10: 110.92 – 111.02 Mb	Chr 19: 53.93 – 54.02 Mb
PubMed search
- Wikidata
View/Edit Human	View/Edit Mouse

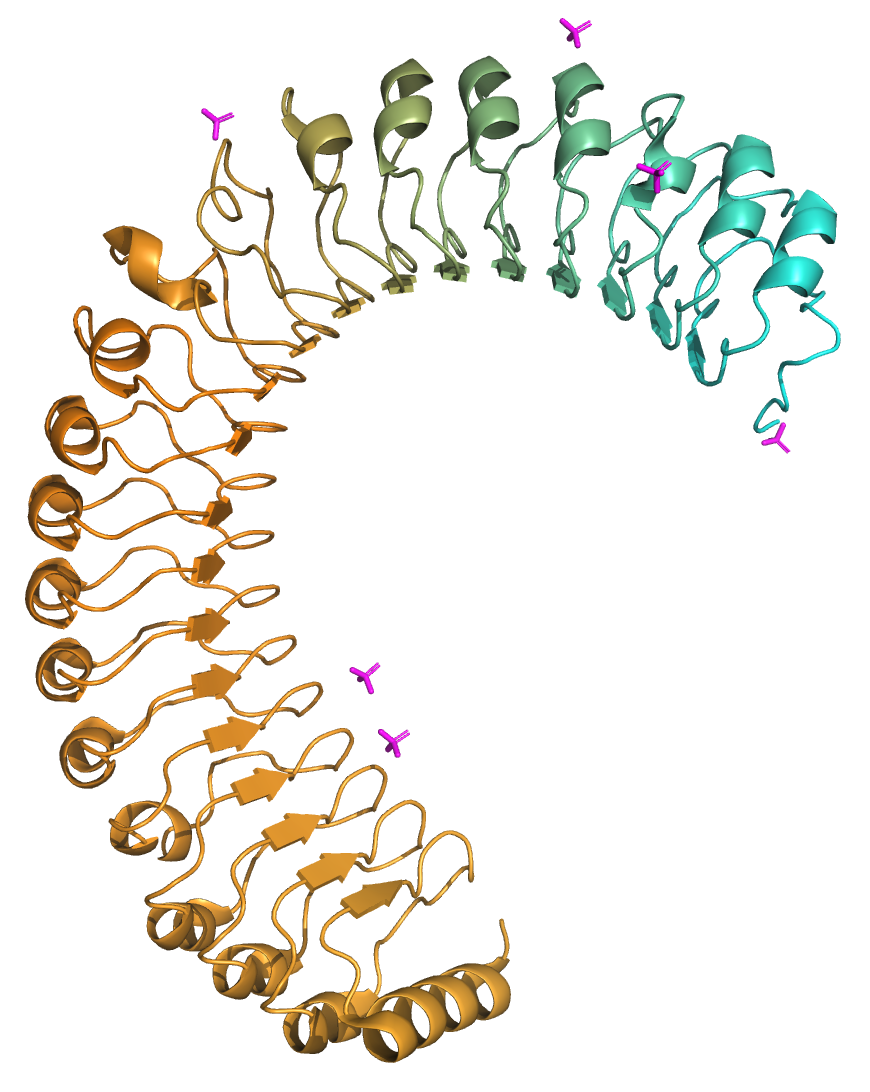
Biological assembly of SHOC2 protein as shown by crystal structure to a resolution of 2.4 Angstrom. Sulfate molecules are labeled purple. Structure from 10.2210/pdb7TVG/pdb.

SHOC2 protein leucine rich domain. Leucine amino acids shown as bright orange sticks.

Leucine-rich repeat protein SHOC-2 is a protein that in humans is encoded by the SHOC2 gene.

== Function ==
This protein was initially identified in Caenorhabditis elegans as SUR-8/SOC2 and was found to be a critical positive regulator of the ERK1/2 signaling pathway that integrates the Ras and RAF components of the ERK1/2 pathway into a multiprotein complex. Specifically, SHOC2 tethers RAS and PP1C proteins and in close proximity to RAF to dephosphorylate “S259” to enable MAPK signaling.

The best-studied role of SHOC2 is in modulating signals of the extracellular signal-regulated kinase 1 and 2 (ERK1/2) pathway by forming a holophosphatase complex that activates RAF proteins.

== Dynamic regulation of MAPK signaling ==
The amplitude of SHOC2-mediated ERK1/2 signals has been proposed to be regulated by differential regulation of RAF activation at the plasma membrane and internalized endosome compartment as well an alternative model proposing post-translational modifications. SHOC2 ubiquitination mediated by HUWE1 is triggered by growth factor activation of the ERK1/2 pathway and is a prerequisite for the subsequent ubiquitination of the RAF-1 kinase associated with SHOC2. However, the current data has yet to address how these ubiquitin modifications regulate the SHOC2 holophosphatase function to reduce the amplitude of RAF-ERK1/2 signals.

== Clinical significance ==
It has been shown that activity that results in lipidation (specifically Myristoylation) of SHOC2 can cause Noonan syndrome.

== Interactions ==
SHOC2 has been shown to interact with the catalytic phosphatase subunit PP1C and MRAS as well as canonical RAS isoforms (H/K/NRAS). The ternary complex SHOC2-RAS-PP1C functions to dephosphorylate an inhibitory phosphorylation site ('S259') on RAF family proteins to enable MAPK signaling.
