= Tyrosine-protein kinase CSK =

Kinase enzyme that phosphorylates Src-family kinases

CSK
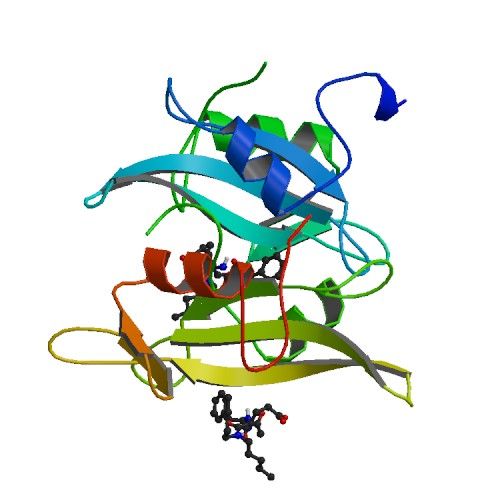

Identifiers
- Aliases: CSK, Src, c-src tyrosine kinase, CSK/Src, non-receptor tyrosine kinase, C-terminal Src kinase
- External IDs: OMIM: 190090, 124095; MGI: 88537; GeneCards: CSK
Available structures
PDB	Ortholog search: H3BU69 PDBe H3BU69 RCSB
PDB	List of PDB id codes 1BYG, 1CSK, 3D7T, 3D7U, 3EAC, 3EAZ
Enzyme activity
EC #	BRENDA	ExPASy	KEGG	MetaCyc
2.7.10.4	↗	↗	↗	↗

Gene location (Human)
Chr.	Chromosome 15 (human)
Band	15q24.1	Start	74,782,057 bp
Band	15q24.1	End	74,803,198 bp

Gene location (Mouse)
Chr.	Chromosome 9 (mouse)
Band	9 B|9 31.18 cM	Start	57,533,929 bp
Band	9 B|9 31.18 cM	End	57,560,914 bp
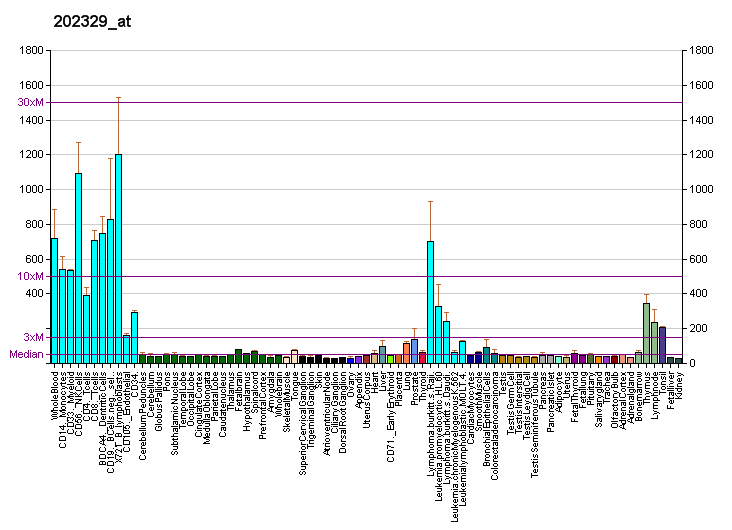
RNA expression pattern
Bgee	Human / Mouse (ortholog); Top expressed in: granulocyte; monocyte; spleen; blood; lymph node; appendix; mucosa of transverse colon; tonsil; bone marrow cell; stromal cell of endometrium / Top expressed in: granulocyte; mesenteric lymph nodes; thymus; spleen; neural layer of retina; lip; ventricular zone; blood; yolk sac; gastrula; More reference expression data
BioGPS	More reference expression data
Gene ontology
Molecular function	transferase activity; nucleotide binding; protein kinase activity; protein kinase A catalytic subunit binding; non-membrane spanning protein tyrosine kinase activity; metal ion binding; protein C-terminus binding; protein binding; identical protein binding; protein tyrosine kinase activity; protein phosphatase binding; proline-rich region binding; signaling receptor binding; ATP binding; kinase activity
Cellular component	cytoplasm; cytosol; membrane; cell-cell junction; extrinsic component of cytoplasmic side of plasma membrane; plasma membrane; membrane raft; extracellular exosome
Biological process	cell differentiation; adaptive immune response; positive regulation of MAP kinase activity; epidermal growth factor receptor signaling pathway; negative regulation of phagocytosis; phosphorylation; transmembrane receptor protein tyrosine kinase signaling pathway; negative regulation of low-density lipoprotein particle clearance; immune system process; negative regulation of interleukin-6 production; T cell costimulation; oligodendrocyte differentiation; negative regulation of Golgi to plasma membrane protein transport; regulation of Fc receptor mediated stimulatory signaling pathway; regulation of cytokine production; protein phosphorylation; brain development; cellular response to peptide hormone stimulus; regulation of cell population proliferation; peptidyl-tyrosine autophosphorylation; negative regulation of ERK1 and ERK2 cascade; protein autophosphorylation; innate immune response; adherens junction organization; T cell receptor signaling pathway; negative regulation of cell population proliferation; negative regulation of bone resorption; negative regulation of kinase activity; central nervous system development; peptidyl-tyrosine phosphorylation
Sources:Amigo / QuickGO
Orthologs
Databases	NCBI: entry; OMA: entry
Species	Human	Mouse
Entrez	1445	12988
Ensembl	ENSG00000103653	ENSMUSG00000032312
UniProt	P41240	P41241
RefSeq (mRNA)	NM_001127190; NM_004383; NM_001354988	NM_007783; NM_001304761
RefSeq (protein)	NP_001120662; NP_004374; NP_001341917	NP_001291690; NP_031809
Location (UCSC)	Chr 15: 74.78 – 74.8 Mb	Chr 9: 57.53 – 57.56 Mb
PubMed search
- Wikidata
View/Edit Human	View/Edit Mouse

Tyrosine-protein kinase CSK also known as C-terminal Src kinase is an enzyme that, in humans, is encoded by the CSK gene. This enzyme phosphorylates tyrosine residues located in the C-terminal end of Src-family kinases (SFKs) including SRC, HCK, FYN, LCK, LYN and YES1.

== Function ==
This Non-receptor tyrosine-protein kinase plays an important role in the regulation of cell growth, differentiation, migration and immune response. CSK acts by suppressing the activity of the Src family of protein kinases by phosphorylation of Src family members at a conserved C-terminal tail site in Src. Upon phosphorylation by other kinases, Src-family members engage in intramolecular interactions between the phosphotyrosine tail and the SH2 domain that result in an inactive conformation. To inhibit SFKs, CSK is then recruited to the plasma membrane via binding to transmembrane proteins or adapter proteins located near the plasma membrane and ultimately suppresses signaling through various surface receptors, including T-cell receptor (TCR) and B-cell receptor (BCR) by phosphorylating and maintaining inactive several effector molecules.

== Role in development and regulation ==
Tyrosine-protein kinase CSK is involved in the following developmental, metabolic, and signal transduction cascades:

Adherens junction organization, blood coagulation, brain development, cell differentiation, cell migration, cellular response to peptide hormone stimulus, central nervous system development, epidermal growth factor receptor signaling pathway, innate immune response, epithelium morphogenesis, regulation of bone resorption, negative regulation of cell proliferation, negative regulation of ERK1 and ERK2 cascade, negative regulation of Golgi to plasma membrane protein transport, negative regulation of interleukin-6 production, negative regulation of kinase activity, negative regulation of low-density lipoprotein particle clearance, negative regulation of phagocytosis, dendrocyte differentiation, peptidyl-tyrosine autophosphorylation, platelet activation, positive regulation of MAP kinase activity, regulation of cell proliferation, regulation of cytokine production, regulation of Fc receptor mediated stimulatory signaling pathway, T cell costimulation, T cell receptor signaling pathway.

== Expression and subcellular location ==
CSK is expressed in the lungs and macrophages as well as several other tissues. Tyrosine-Kinase CSK is mainly present in the cytoplasm, but also found in lipid rafts making cell-cell junction.

== Mutations ==
- Y184F – Abolishes phosphorylation.
- Y304F – Decreases activity by two-thirds and alters conformation.
- S364A – Strong decrease of phosphorylation by PRKACA (the catalytic subunit of protein kinase A).

== Clinical significance ==
Csk's interaction with a phosphatase ("Lyp", gene product of PTPN22) is possibly associated with the increased autoimmune diseases associated with PTPN22 mutations.
