= Vociprotafib =

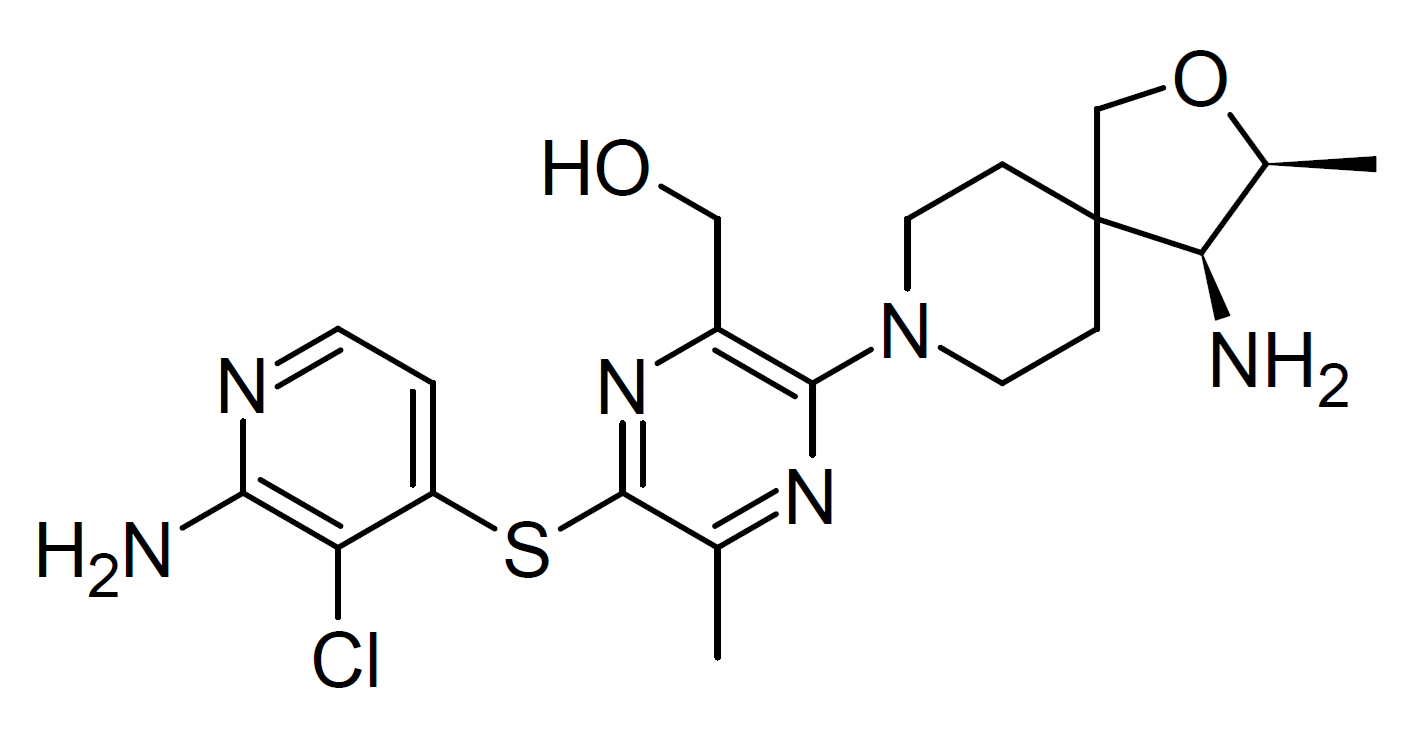

Clinical data
- Drug class: SHP2 inhibitor

Identifiers
- IUPAC name: [6-[(2-amino-3-chloro-4-pyridinyl)sulfanyl]-3-[(3S,4S)-4-amino-3-methyl-2-oxa-8-azaspiro[4.5]decan-8-yl]-5-methylpyrazin-2-yl]methanol
- CAS Number: 2172652-48-9
- PubChem CID: 134182831
- DrugBank: DB21559
- ChemSpider: 115009719
- UNII: C4YBF9170L
- KEGG: D12799
- ChEMBL: ChEMBL5314427

Chemical and physical data
- Formula: C_{20}H_{27}ClN_{6}O_{2}S
- Molar mass: 450.99 g·mol^{−1}
- 3D model (JSmol): Interactive image
- SMILES: C[C@H]1[C@H](C2(CCN(CC2)C3=NC(=C(N=C3CO)SC4=C(C(=NC=C4)N)Cl)C)CO1)N
- InChI: InChI=1S/C20H27ClN6O2S/c1-11-19(30-14-3-6-24-17(23)15(14)21)26-13(9-28)18(25-11)27-7-4-20(5-8-27)10-29-12(2)16(20)22/h3,6,12,16,28H,4-5,7-10,22H2,1-2H3,(H2,23,24)/t12-,16+/m0/s1; Key:HISJAYUQVHMWTA-BLLLJJGKSA-N

Vociprotafib (RMC-4630) is a drug that acts as an inhibitor of the protein tyrosine phosphatase enzyme SHP-2 (PTPN11). It has been researched for the treatment of cancer and has seen some early stage clinical trials in humans.
