= Jacqueline Noonan =

American pediatric cardiologist (1928–2020)

Jacqueline A. Noonan
- Born: October 28, 1928; Burlington, Vermont, United States
- Died: July 23, 2020 (aged 91)
- Resting place: Lexington, Kentucky, United States
- Education: Albertus Magnus College (B.S.), University of Vermont (M.D.), Cincinnati Children's Hospital Medical Center (Residency), Children's Hospital Boston (Fellowship)
- Occupations: Pediatric; Cardiologist
- Employer: University of Kentucky
- Known for: Noonan Syndrome, hypoplastic left heart syndrome
- Title: Professor Emerita

Jacqueline Anne Noonan (October 28, 1928 – July 23, 2020) was an American pediatric cardiologist best known for her characterization of a genetic disorder now called Noonan syndrome. She was also the original describer of hypoplastic left heart syndrome.

== Biography ==
Noonan was born October 28, 1928, in Burlington, Vermont, United States the daughter of Francis and Eugenia Noonan. She had three sisters, Beverly, Joan, and Joyce. She studied chemistry at Albertus Magnus College, medicine at the University of Vermont, and became certified in her field in Boston in 1956. She subsequently began work at the University of Iowa. As their first pediatric cardiologist, she noticed that children with a rare type of heart defect called pulmonary valve stenosis often had a characteristic physical appearance with short stature, webbed neck, wide-spaced eyes, and low-set ears. She presented her first paper on the subject in 1963, and after several more papers and recognition, the condition was officially named Noonan syndrome in 1971. Dr. Noonan moved on to the fledgling University of Kentucky medical school in 1961, where she served for over forty years. An endowed chair in pediatric research has been established in her name, and while she semi-retired as of 2007, she was still working at age 85 as of February 2014. She died on July 23, 2020, at the age of 91 with services being held at Cathedral of Christ the King in Lexington, Kentucky on July 27.

== Recognition ==
Aside from the rare distinction of having a medical condition named after her, Noonan has received numerous other honors, including the 1971 Helen B. Frazer Award, the 1985 Harpers Bazaar's Best Women Doctors in America, and later The Best Doctors in America award. She received the A. Bradley Soule Award from the University of Vermont College of Medicine for dedication to the college as an alumna and mentor to medical students.
