= PTPN5 =

Protein-coding gene in the species Homo sapiens

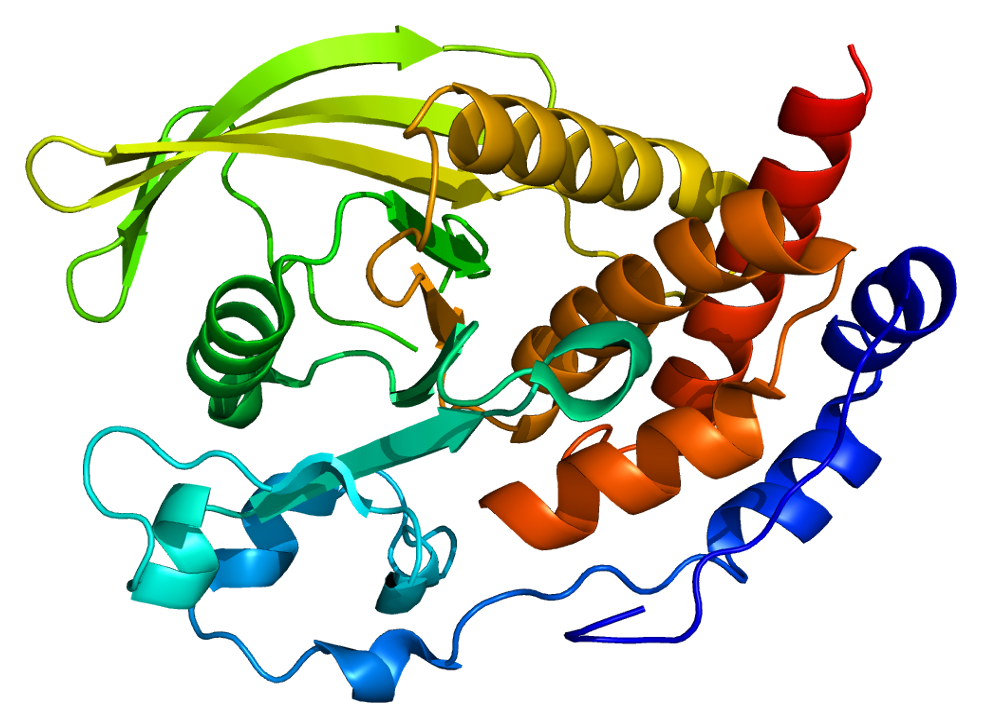

Identifiers
- Aliases: PTPN5, PTPSTEP, STEP, STEP61, protein tyrosine phosphatase, non-receptor type 5, protein tyrosine phosphatase non-receptor type 5
- External IDs: OMIM: 176879; MGI: 97807; GeneCards: PTPN5
Available structures
PDB	Ortholog search: PDBe RCSB
PDB	List of PDB id codes 2BIJ, 2BV5, 2CJZ
Enzyme activity
EC #	BRENDA	ExPASy	KEGG	MetaCyc
3.1.3.48	↗	↗	↗	↗

Gene location (Human)
Chr.	Chromosome 11 (human)
Band	11p15.1	Start	18,727,928 bp
Band	11p15.1	End	18,792,721 bp

Gene location (Mouse)
Chr.	Chromosome 7 (mouse)
Band	7 B3|7 30.7 cM	Start	46,727,543 bp
Band	7 B3|7 30.7 cM	End	46,783,432 bp
RNA expression pattern
Bgee	Human / Mouse (ortholog); Top expressed in: endothelial cell; middle temporal gyrus; Brodmann area 23; nucleus accumbens; putamen; primary visual cortex; caudate nucleus; external globus pallidus; superior frontal gyrus; postcentral gyrus / Top expressed in: olfactory tubercle; superior frontal gyrus; nucleus accumbens; lateral septal nucleus; globus pallidus; primary visual cortex; anterior amygdaloid area; nucleus of stria terminalis; medial dorsal nucleus; lateral geniculate nucleus; More reference expression data
BioGPS	n/a
Gene ontology
Molecular function	phosphoprotein phosphatase activity; phosphatase activity; phosphotyrosine residue binding; protein binding; protein tyrosine phosphatase activity; hydrolase activity
Cellular component	integral component of membrane; endoplasmic reticulum membrane; membrane; endoplasmic reticulum; nucleoplasm
Biological process	protein dephosphorylation; peptidyl-tyrosine dephosphorylation; dephosphorylation; cellular response to cytokine stimulus
Sources:Amigo / QuickGO
Orthologs
Databases	NCBI: entry; OMA: entry
Species	Human	Mouse
Entrez	84867	19259
Ensembl	ENSG00000110786	ENSMUSG00000030854
UniProt	P54829	P54830
RefSeq (mRNA)	NM_001039970; NM_001278236; NM_001278238; NM_001278239; NM_006906 NM_032781	NM_001163565; NM_013643
RefSeq (protein)	NP_001035059; NP_001265165; NP_001265167; NP_001265168; NP_008837 NP_116170	NP_001157037; NP_038671
Location (UCSC)	Chr 11: 18.73 – 18.79 Mb	Chr 7: 46.73 – 46.78 Mb
PubMed search
- Wikidata
View/Edit Human	View/Edit Mouse

Protein tyrosine phosphatase non-receptor type 5 is an enzyme that in humans is encoded by the PTPN5 gene.

Protein tyrosine phosphatase (PTP), non-receptor type 5, also known as STEP (STriatal-Enriched protein tyrosine Phosphatase), was the first brain-specific PTP discovered. The human STEP locus maps to chromosome 11p15.2-p15.1 and the murine STEP gene to chromosome 7B3-B5. The single STEP gene is alternatively spliced to produce several isoforms, the best characterized of which are the cytosolic STEP_{46} protein and the membrane-associated STEP_{61} protein.

== Substrates ==
Seven known targets of STEP have been identified as of 2015, including ERK1/2, p38, Fyn, Pyk2, PTPα, and the glutamate receptor subunits GluN2B and GluA2. STEP dephosphorylation of the kinases (ERK1/2, p38, Fyn, and Pyk2) occurs at a regulatory tyrosine within the kinase activation loop and leads to their inactivation. Dephosphorylation of a regulatory tyrosine on PTPα prevents the translocation of PTPα from the cytosol to lipid rafts, where it normally activates Fyn. STEP thereby directly inactivates Fyn and also prevents the translocation of PTPα to compartments where it activates Fyn. STEP dephosphorylation of GluN2B and GluA2 leads to the internalization of NMDARs (GluN1/GluN2B) and AMPARs (GluA1/GluA2). Thus, one function of STEP is to oppose synaptic strengthening by inactivating kinases and internalizing receptors that are critical for the development of synaptic strengthening.

== Clinical significance ==
STEP levels are disrupted in several diseases. Alzheimer's disease (AD) was the first illness to be associated with elevated STEP expression both in human cortex and in several mouse models of AD. STEP is also increased in fragile X syndrome, schizophrenia, and Parkinson's disease. In AD and FXS mouse models, genetic reduction of STEP expression reverses many of the cognitive and behavioral deficits. Other laboratories have now shown that STEP activity is also reduced in several additional disorders. Thus, STEP levels or activity is decreased in Huntington's disease, cerebral ischemia, alcohol abuse, and stress disorders. The emergent model suggests that an optimal level of STEP is required at synaptic sites, and that both high and low levels disrupt synaptic function.

== Inhibition ==
Several STEP inhibitors have now been discovered. GlaxoSmithKline chose STEP as a new project for their Discovery Partnerships with Academia (DPAc) in 2014. This is a program in drug discovery that brings together the academic world and GSK to discover new inhibitors of validated targets.

- TC-2153
