= Pulmonary valve stenosis =

Heart valve disorder

- Other names: Valvular pulmonary stenosis
- Specialty: Cardiology
- Symptoms: Cyanosis, dizziness
- Causes: Congenital (most often)
- Diagnostic method: Echocardiogram, Ultrasound
- Treatment: Valve replacement or surgical repair

Pulmonary valve stenosis (PVS) is a heart valve disorder. Blood going from the heart to the lungs goes through the pulmonary valve, whose purpose is to prevent blood from flowing back to the heart. In pulmonary valve stenosis this opening is too narrow, leading to a reduction of flow of blood to the lungs.

While the most common cause of pulmonary valve stenosis is congenital heart disease, it may also be due to a malignant carcinoid tumor. Both stenosis of the pulmonary artery and pulmonary valve stenosis are forms of pulmonic stenosis (nonvalvular and valvular, respectively) but pulmonary valve stenosis accounts for 80% of pulmonic stenosis. PVS was the key finding that led Jacqueline Noonan to identify the syndrome now called Noonan syndrome.

== Symptoms and signs ==
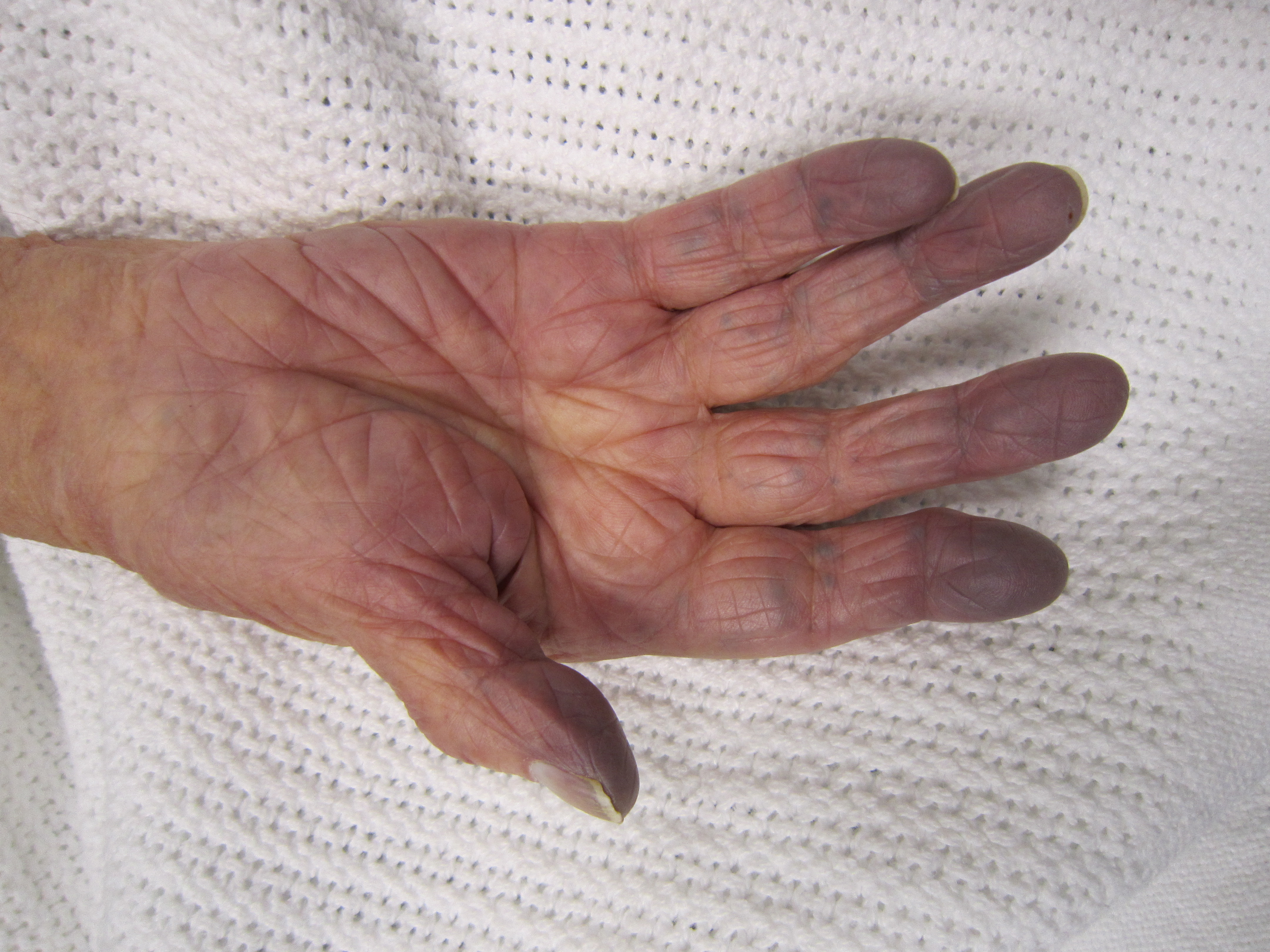
Cyanosis

Among some of the symptoms consistent with pulmonary valve stenosis are the following:

- Heart murmur
- Cyanosis
- Dyspnea
- Dizziness
- Upper thorax pain
- Developmental disorders

== Cause ==
In regards to the cause of pulmonary valve stenosis a very high percentage are congenital, the right ventricular flow is hindered (or obstructed by this). The cause in turn is divided into: valvular, external and intrinsic (when it is acquired).

== Pathophysiology ==
The pathophysiology of pulmonary valve stenosis consists of the valve leaflets becoming too thick (therefore not separate one from another), which can cause increased end-systolic and end-diastolic pressure in right ventricle. Furthermore this can lead to the right atrial hypetrophy and possibly developing arrhythmias. But even people with severe pulmonary valve stenosis do not develop pulmonary hypertension. This however, does not mean the cause is always congenital.

At first, a diastolic dysfunction of the right ventricle occurs, thus right ventricle being able to maintain the blood flow despite the rising afterload. However, advanced changes may lead to also systolic dysfunction and a heart failure development.The left ventricle can be changed physically, these changes are a direct result of right ventricular hypertrophy. Once the obstruction is subdued, it (the left ventricle) can return to normal.

== Diagnosis ==
Pulmonary valve stenosis on an echocardiogram

The diagnosis of pulmonary valve stenosis can be made using stethoscopic auscultation of the heart, which can reveal a systolic ejection murmur that is best heard at the second left intercostal space. Transthoracic or transesophageal echocardiography can provide a more accurate diagnosis. Obstetric ultrasonography can be useful for the in utero diagnosis of pulmonary valve stenosis and other congenital cardiovascular defects such as Tetralogy of Fallot.

Other conditions to consider in the differential diagnosis of pulmonic valvular stenosis include infundibular stenosis and pulmonary artery stenosis.

== Treatment ==
In terms of treatment for pulmonary valve stenosis, valve replacement or surgical repair (depending upon whether the stenosis is in the valve or vessel) may be indicated. If the valve stenosis is of congenital origin, balloon valvuloplasty is another option, depending on the case. Valves made from animal or human tissue (are used for valve replacement), in adults metal valves can be used.

== Epidemiology ==
The epidemiology of pulmonary valve stenosis can be summed up by the congenital aspect which is the majority of cases, in broad terms PVS is rare in the general population.
