= Glecirasib =

Clinical data
- Drug class: KRAS G12C inhibitor
- ATC code: None

Legal status
- Legal status: Rx in China

Identifiers
- IUPAC name: (1M)-7-(2-Amino-3,4,5,6-tetrafluorophenyl)-6-chloro-1-[4-methyl-2-(propan-2-yl)pyridin-3-yl]-2-oxo-4-[4-(prop-2-enoyl)piperazin-1-yl]-1,2-dihydro-1,8- naphthyridine-3-carbonitrile
- CAS Number: 2657613-87-9
- PubChem CID: 157827766
- UNII: UP75WH4QKM

Chemical and physical data
- Formula: C_{31}H_{26}ClF_{4}N_{7}O_{2}
- Molar mass: 640.04 g·mol^{−1}
- 3D model (JSmol): Interactive image
- SMILES: CC1=C(C(=NC=C1)C(C)C)N2C3=NC(=C(C=C3C(=C(C2=O)C#N)N4CCN(CC4)C(=O)C=C)Cl)C5=C(C(=C(C(=C5F)F)F)F)N
- InChI: InChI=1S/C31H26ClF4N7O2/c1-5-19(44)41-8-10-42(11-9-41)29-16-12-18(32)27(20-21(33)22(34)23(35)24(36)25(20)38)40-30(16)43(31(45)17(29)13-37)28-15(4)6-7-39-26(28)14(2)3/h5-7,12,14H,1,8-11,38H2,2-4H3; Key:QRRJEUIQLZNPIO-UHFFFAOYSA-N

Glecirasib (JAB-21822) is a pharmaceutical drug used for cancer treatment. It is a selective inhibitor of the G12C mutant version of the enzyme KRAS. It is used as a combination treatment alongside other selective enzyme inhibitors.
