= PTPN11 =

Protein-coding gene in humans

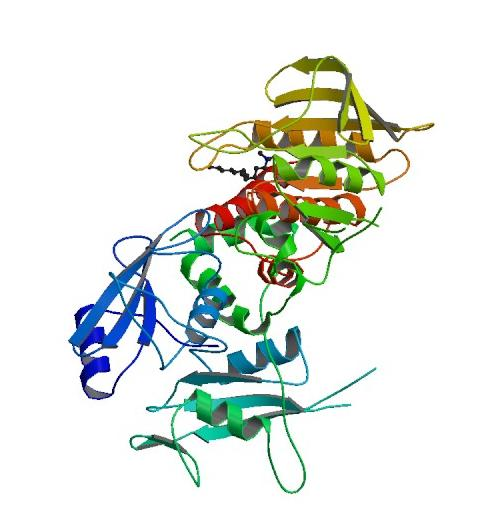

Identifiers
- Aliases: PTPN11, BPTP3, CFC, JMML, METCDS, NS1, PTP-1D, PTP2C, SH-PTP2, SH-PTP3, SHP2, protein tyrosine phosphatase, non-receptor type 11, protein tyrosine phosphatase non-receptor type 11
- External IDs: OMIM: 176876; MGI: 99511; GeneCards: PTPN11
Available structures
PDB	Ortholog search: PDBe RCSB
PDB	List of PDB id codes 2SHP, 3B7O, 3MOW, 3O5X, 3TKZ, 3TL0, 4DGP, 4DGX, 4GWF, 4H1O, 4JE4, 4JEG, 3ZM0, 3ZM1, 3ZM2, 3ZM3, 4H34, 4JMG, 4NWF, 4NWG, 4OHD, 4OHE, 4OHH, 4OHI, 4OHL, 4PVG, 4RDD, 4QSY, 5DF6, 5IBS, 5EHP, 5EHR, 5I6V, 5IBM
Enzyme activity
EC #	BRENDA	ExPASy	KEGG	MetaCyc
3.1.3.48	↗	↗	↗	↗

Gene location (Human)
Chr.	Chromosome 12 (human)
Band	12q24.13	Start	112,418,351 bp
Band	12q24.13	End	112,509,918 bp

Gene location (Mouse)
Chr.	Chromosome 5 (mouse)
Band	5|5 F	Start	121,268,596 bp
Band	5|5 F	End	121,329,460 bp
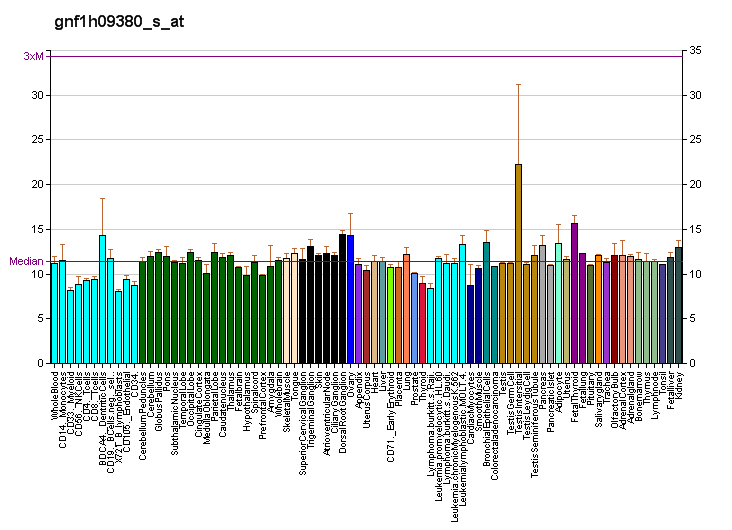
RNA expression pattern
Bgee	Human / Mouse (ortholog); Top expressed in: internal globus pallidus; dorsal motor nucleus of vagus nerve; Brodmann area 23; visceral pleura; parietal pleura; subthalamic nucleus; pars reticulata; inferior olivary nucleus; Epithelium of choroid plexus; external globus pallidus / Top expressed in: renal corpuscle; Epithelium of choroid plexus; utricle; medullary collecting duct; retinal pigment epithelium; substantia nigra; ciliary body; iris; endocardial cushion; primitive streak; More reference expression data
BioGPS	More reference expression data
Gene ontology
Molecular function	phospholipase binding; phosphoprotein phosphatase activity; insulin receptor binding; phosphatase activity; receptor tyrosine kinase binding; peptide hormone receptor binding; protein binding; non-membrane spanning protein tyrosine phosphatase activity; hydrolase activity; phosphatidylinositol-4,5-bisphosphate 3-kinase activity; 1-phosphatidylinositol-3-kinase activity; cell adhesion molecule binding; protein tyrosine phosphatase activity; phosphotyrosine residue binding; protein domain specific binding; D1 dopamine receptor binding; insulin receptor substrate binding; protein tyrosine kinase binding; protein kinase binding
Cellular component	cytoplasm; cytosol; mitochondrion; nucleus; nucleoplasm; protein-containing complex
Biological process	dephosphorylation; megakaryocyte development; positive regulation of signal transduction; negative regulation of insulin secretion; regulation of cell adhesion mediated by integrin; atrioventricular canal development; intestinal epithelial cell migration; organ growth; epidermal growth factor receptor signaling pathway; negative regulation of growth hormone secretion; axonogenesis; glucose homeostasis; regulation of protein export from nucleus; multicellular organism growth; regulation of multicellular organism growth; lipid metabolism; ephrin receptor signaling pathway; abortive mitotic cell cycle; DNA damage checkpoint signaling; protein dephosphorylation; T cell costimulation; platelet formation; microvillus organization; positive regulation of mitotic cell cycle; genitalia development; platelet activation; fibroblast growth factor receptor signaling pathway; development of the heart; brain development; regulation of type I interferon-mediated signaling pathway; hormone-mediated signaling pathway; integrin-mediated signaling pathway; Bergmann glial cell differentiation; homeostasis of number of cells within a tissue; inner ear development; platelet-derived growth factor receptor signaling pathway; negative regulation of cortisol secretion; peptidyl-tyrosine dephosphorylation; ERBB signaling pathway; negative regulation of hormone secretion; triglyceride metabolic process; hormone metabolic process; positive regulation of hormone secretion; negative regulation of cell adhesion mediated by integrin; regulation of protein-containing complex assembly; face morphogenesis; cerebellar cortex formation; leukocyte migration; multicellular organismal reproductive process; phosphatidylinositol phosphate biosynthetic process; neurotrophin TRK receptor signaling pathway; phosphatidylinositol-3-phosphate biosynthetic process; axon guidance; positive regulation of ERK1 and ERK2 cascade; cellular response to epidermal growth factor stimulus; positive regulation of protein kinase B signaling; cytokine-mediated signaling pathway; interleukin-6-mediated signaling pathway; cellular response to cytokine stimulus; cellular response to mechanical stimulus; positive regulation of interferon-beta production; positive regulation of interleukin-6 production; positive regulation of tumor necrosis factor production; positive regulation of glucose import; positive regulation of insulin receptor signaling pathway
Sources:Amigo / QuickGO
Orthologs
Databases	NCBI: entry; OMA: entry
Species	Human	Mouse
Entrez	5781	19247
Ensembl	ENSG00000179295	ENSMUSG00000043733
UniProt	Q06124	P35235
RefSeq (mRNA)	NM_002834; NM_080601; NM_001330437; NM_001374625; NM_018508	NM_001109992; NM_011202
RefSeq (protein)	NP_001317366; NP_002825; NP_542168; NP_001361554	NP_001103462; NP_035332
Location (UCSC)	Chr 12: 112.42 – 112.51 Mb	Chr 5: 121.27 – 121.33 Mb
PubMed search
- Wikidata
View/Edit Human	View/Edit Mouse

Tyrosine-protein phosphatase non-receptor type 11 (PTPN11) also known as protein-tyrosine phosphatase 1D (PTP-1D), Src homology region 2 domain-containing phosphatase-2 (SHP-2), or protein-tyrosine phosphatase 2C (PTP-2C) is an enzyme that in humans is encoded by the PTPN11 gene. PTPN11 is a protein tyrosine phosphatase (PTP) Shp2.

PTPN11 is a member of the protein tyrosine phosphatase (PTP) family. PTPs are known to be signaling molecules that regulate a variety of cellular processes including cell growth, differentiation, mitotic cycle, and oncogenic transformation. This PTP contains two tandem Src homology-2 domains, which function as phospho-tyrosine binding domains and mediate the interaction of this PTP with its substrates. This PTP is widely expressed in most tissues and plays a regulatory role in various cell signaling events that are important for a diversity of cell functions, such as mitogenic activation, metabolic control, transcription regulation, and cell migration. Mutations in this gene are a cause of Noonan syndrome as well as acute myeloid leukemia.

Evolution: Although lost in rodents and higher primates, most jawed vertebrates, including sharks, have a second ancient molecule that is very similar to PTPN11 (SHP-2) and has been named SHP-2like (SHP-2L). In zebrafish, SHP-2 and SHP-2L have overlapping functional abilities. SHP-2 and SHP-2L are quite distinct from SHP-1 (PTPN6).

== Structure ==
PTPN11 encodes the protein tyrosine phosphatase SHP2, which has a modular structure essential for its regulatory function in cell signaling. SHP2 consists of two tandem Src homology 2 (SH2) domains at the N-terminus (N-SH2 and C-SH2), followed by a catalytic protein tyrosine phosphatase (PTP) domain and a C-terminal tail containing tyrosyl phosphorylation sites. In its inactive, auto-inhibited conformation, the N-SH2 domain binds intramolecularly to the PTP catalytic domain, blocking substrate access to the active site. Upon binding to phosphotyrosyl residues on target proteins, the N-SH2 domain undergoes a conformational change that releases the PTP domain, thereby activating the enzyme. The catalytic domain itself adopts a conserved fold characteristic of classical PTPs, featuring a catalytic loop (WPD loop) that undergoes conformational changes during substrate binding and catalysis. This structural arrangement allows SHP2 to tightly regulate signaling pathways by selectively dephosphorylating substrates involved in cell growth, differentiation, and migration. Mutations disrupting the interface between the N-SH2 and PTP domains can lead to constitutive activation or impairment of SHP2, underlying diseases such as Noonan syndrome and certain leukemias. The overall structure has been elucidated by multiple crystallographic studies, revealing both the auto-inhibited and active states, which provide insight into its mechanism of regulation and function in diverse cellular contexts.

== Function ==
PTPN11 encodes SHP2, a ubiquitously expressed protein tyrosine phosphatase that plays an important role in regulating cell signaling pathways, most notably the RAS/MAPK cascade, which controls cell proliferation, differentiation, migration, and survival. SHP2 acts as a positive regulator of signal transduction by dephosphorylating specific phosphotyrosine residues on target proteins, thereby facilitating the propagation of growth factor and cytokine signals. During embryonic development, SHP2 is essential for the formation of the heart, blood cells, bones, and other tissues. Germline mutations in PTPN11 cause developmental disorders such as Noonan syndrome and LEOPARD syndrome, while somatic mutations are frequently implicated in hematologic malignancies and solid tumors by promoting aberrant activation of oncogenic pathways. In cancer, SHP2 can function as an oncogenic driver by sustaining RAS/RAF/MAPK signaling and supporting tumor cell growth and survival. Thus, PTPN11/SHP2 is a critical regulator of both normal cellular processes and disease states, with its dysregulation contributing to developmental syndromes and oncogenesis.

== Clinical significance ==
Missense mutations in the PTPN11 locus are associated with both Noonan syndrome and Leopard syndrome. At least 79 disease-causing mutations in this gene have been discovered.

=== Noonan syndrome ===
In the case of Noonan syndrome, mutations are broadly distributed throughout the coding region of the gene but all appear to result in hyper-activated, or unregulated mutant forms of the protein. Most of these mutations disrupt the binding interface between the N-SH2 domain and catalytic core necessary for the enzyme to maintain its auto-inhibited conformation.

=== Noonan syndrome with multiple lentigines ===
The mutations that cause Noonan syndrome with multiple lentigines (formerly known as leopard syndrome) are restricted regions affecting the catalytic core of the enzyme producing catalytically impaired Shp2 variants. It is currently unclear how mutations that give rise to mutant variants of Shp2 with biochemically opposite characteristics result in similar human genetic syndromes.

=== Metachondromatosis ===
It has also been associated with metachondromatosis.

=== Cancer ===
Patients with a subset of Noonan syndrome PTPN11 mutations also have a higher prevalence of juvenile myelomonocytic leukemias (JMML). Activating Shp2 mutations have also been detected in neuroblastoma, melanoma, acute myeloid leukemia, breast cancer, lung cancer, colorectal cancer. Recently, a relatively high prevalence of PTPN11 mutations (24%) were detected by next-generation sequencing in a cohort of NPM1-mutated acute myeloid leukemia patients, although the prognostic significance of such associations has not been clarified. These data suggests that Shp2 may be a proto-oncogene. However, it has been reported that PTPN11/Shp2 can act as either tumor promoter or suppressor. In aged mouse model, hepatocyte-specific deletion of PTPN11/Shp2 promotes inflammatory signaling through the STAT3 pathway and hepatic inflammation/necrosis, resulting in regenerative hyperplasia and spontaneous development of tumors. Decreased PTPN11/Shp2 expression was detected in a subfraction of human hepatocellular carcinoma (HCC) specimens. The bacterium Helicobacter pylori has been associated with gastric cancer, and this is thought to be mediated in part by the interaction of its virulence factor CagA with SHP2.

=== H pylori CagA virulence factor ===
CagA is a protein and virulence factor inserted by Helicobacter pylori into gastric epithelia. Once activated by SRC phosphorylation, CagA binds to SHP2, allosterically activating it. This leads to morphological changes, abnormal mitogenic signals and sustained activity can result in apoptosis of the host cell. Epidemiological studies have shown roles of cagA- positive H. pylori in the development of atrophic gastritis, peptic ulcer disease and gastric carcinoma.

== Interactions ==
PTPN11 has been shown to interact with

- CagA,
- Cbl gene,
- CD117,
- CD31,
- CEACAM1,
- Epidermal growth factor receptor,
- Erk
- FRS2,
- GAB1,
- GAB2,
- GAB3,
- Glycoprotein 130,
- Grb2,
- Growth hormone receptor,
- HoxA10,
- Insulin receptor,
- Insulin-like growth factor 1 receptor,
- IRS1,
- Janus kinase 1,
- Janus kinase 2,
- LAIR1,
- LRP1,
- PDGFRB,
- PI3K → Akt
- PLCG2,
- PTK2B,
- Ras
- SLAMF1,
- SOCS3,
- SOS1,
- STAT3,
- STAT5A, and
- STAT5B.

== Ligands ==
Inhibitors

- Batoprotafib
- SHP099
- Sitneprotafib
- Vociprotafib (RMC-4630)

AUTACs

- SA-8
