= Protein tyrosine phosphatase =

Class of enzymes

Protein-tyrosine-phosphatase
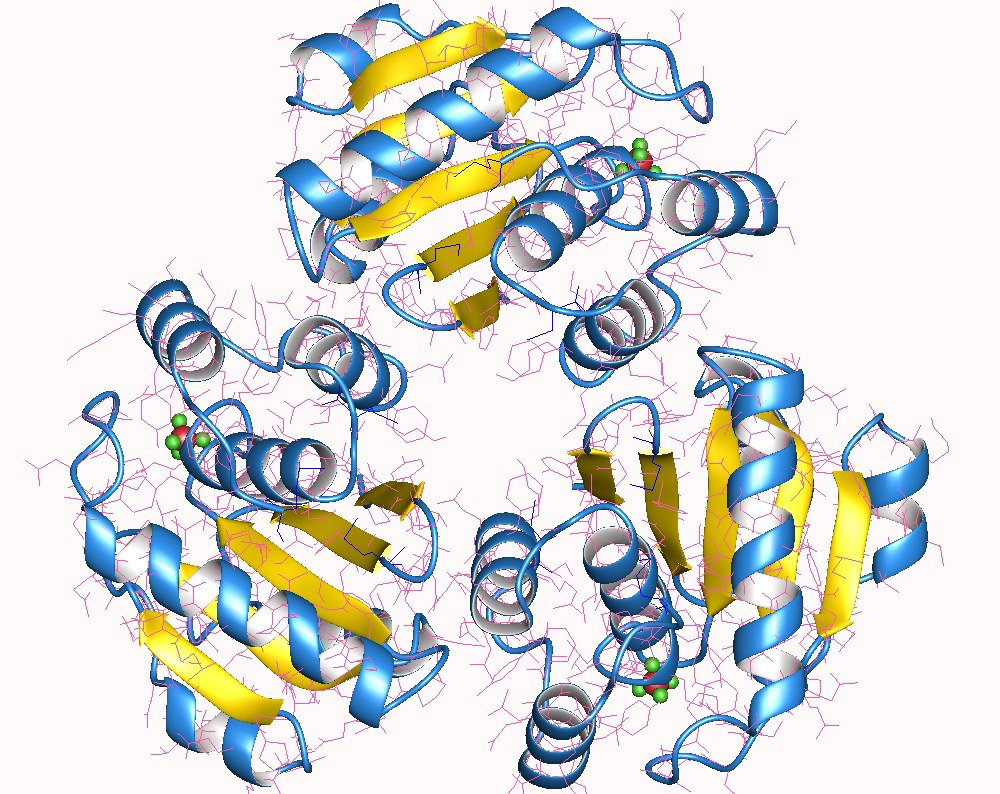
- Protein tyrosine phosphatase 1, trimer, Human

Identifiers
- EC no.: 3.1.3.48
- CAS no.: 79747-53-8

Databases
- IntEnz: IntEnz view
- BRENDA: BRENDA entry
- ExPASy: NiceZyme view
- KEGG: KEGG entry
- MetaCyc: metabolic pathway
- PRIAM: profile
- PDB structures: RCSB PDB PDBe PDBsum
Search
- PMC: articles
- PubMed: articles
- NCBI: proteins

Protein tyrosine phosphatases (EC 3.1.3.48, systematic name protein-tyrosine-phosphate phosphohydrolase) are a group of enzymes that remove phosphate groups from phosphorylated tyrosine residues on proteins:

[a protein]-tyrosine phosphate + H_{2}O = [a protein]-tyrosine + phosphate

Protein tyrosine (pTyr) phosphorylation is a common post-translational modification that can create novel recognition motifs for protein interactions and cellular localization, affect protein stability, and regulate enzyme activity. As a consequence, maintaining an appropriate level of protein tyrosine phosphorylation is essential for many cellular functions. Tyrosine-specific protein phosphatases (PTPase; EC 3.1.3.48) catalyse the removal of a phosphate group attached to a tyrosine residue, using a cysteinyl-phosphate enzyme intermediate. These enzymes are key regulatory components in signal transduction pathways (such as the MAP kinase pathway) and cell cycle control, and are important in the control of cell growth, proliferation, differentiation, transformation, and synaptic plasticity.

== Functions ==
Together with tyrosine kinases, PTPs regulate the phosphorylation state of many important signalling molecules, such as the MAP kinase family. PTPs are increasingly viewed as integral components of signal transduction cascades, despite less study and understanding compared to tyrosine kinases.

PTPs have been implicated in regulation of many cellular processes, including, but not limited to:

- Cell growth
- Cellular differentiation
- Mitotic cycles
- Oncogenic transformation
- Receptor endocytosis

== Classification ==
=== By mechanism ===
PTP activity can be found in four protein families.

Links to all 107 members of the protein tyrosine phosphatase family can be found in the template at the bottom of this article.

==== Class I ====
The class I PTPs, are the largest group of PTPs with 99 members, which can be further subdivided into

- 38 classical PTPs
  - 21 receptor tyrosine phosphatases
  - 17 nonreceptor-type PTPs
- 61 VH-1-like or dual-specificity phosphatases (DSPs)
  - 11 MAPK phosphatases (MPKs)
  - 3 Slingshots
  - 3 PRLs
  - 4 CDC14s
  - 19 atypical DSPs
  - 5 phosphatase and tensin homologs (PTENs)
  - 16 myotubularins

Dual-specificity phosphatases (dTyr and dSer/dThr) dual-specificity protein-tyrosine phosphatases. Ser/Thr and Tyr dual-specificity phosphatases are a group of enzymes with both Ser/Thr (EC 3.1.3.16) and tyrosine-specific protein phosphatase (EC 3.1.3.48) activity able to remove the serine/threonine or the tyrosine-bound phosphate group from a wide range of phosphoproteins, including a number of enzymes that have been phosphorylated under the action of a kinase. Dual-specificity protein phosphatases (DSPs) regulate mitogenic signal transduction and control the cell cycle.

LEOPARD syndrome, Noonan syndrome, and metachondromatosis are associated with PTPN11.

Elevated levels of activated PTPN5 negatively affects synaptic stability and plays a role in Alzheimer's disease, Fragile X syndrome, schizophrenia, and Parkinson's disease. Decreased levels of PTPN5 has been implicated in Huntington's disease, brain ischemia, alcohol use disorder, and stress disorders. Together these findings indicate that only at optimal levels of PTPN5 is synaptic function unimpaired.

==== Class II ====
LMW (low-molecular-weight) phosphatases, or acid phosphatases, act on tyrosine phosphorylated proteins, low-MW aryl phosphates and natural and synthetic acyl phosphates.

The class II PTPs contain only one member, low-molecular-weight phosphotyrosine phosphatase (LMPTP).

==== Class III ====
Cdc25 phosphatases (dTyr and/or dThr)

The Class III PTPs contains three members, CDC25 A, B, and C

==== Class IV ====
These are members of the HAD fold and superfamily, and include phosphatases specific to pTyr and pSer/Thr as well as small molecule phosphatases and other enzymes. The subfamily EYA (eyes absent) is believed to be pTyr-specific, and has four members in human, EYA1, EYA2, EYA3, and EYA4. This class has a distinct catalytic mechanism from the other three classes.

=== By location ===
Based on their cellular localization, PTPases are also classified as:

- Receptor-like, which are transmembrane receptors that contain PTPase domains. In terms of structure, all known receptor PTPases are made up of a variable-length extracellular domain, followed by a transmembrane region and a C-terminal catalytic cytoplasmic domain. Some of the receptor PTPases contain fibronectin type III (FN-III) repeats, immunoglobulin-like domains, MAM domains, or carbonic anhydrase-like domains in their extracellular region. In general, the cytoplasmic region contains two copies of the PTPase domain. The first seems to have enzymatic activity, whereas the second is inactive.
- Non-receptor (intracellular) PTPases

=== Common elements ===
All PTPases, other than those of the EYA family, carry the highly conserved active site motif C(X)5R (PTP signature motif), employ a common catalytic mechanism, and possess a similar core structure made of a central parallel beta-sheet with flanking alpha-helices containing a beta-loop-alpha-loop that encompasses the PTP signature motif. Functional diversity between PTPases is endowed by regulatory domains and subunits.

Low-molecular-weight phosphotyrosine protein phosphatase
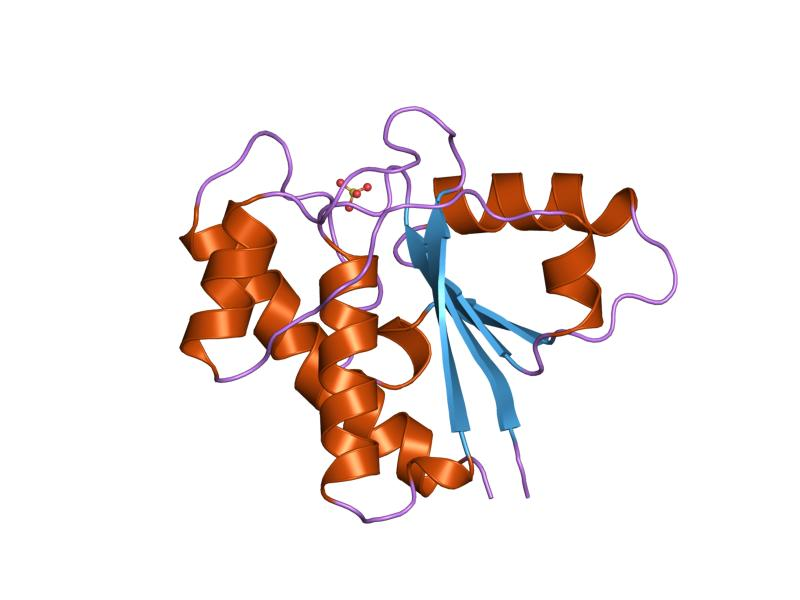
- Structure of a low-molecular-weight phosphotyrosine protein phosphatase.

Identifiers
- Symbol: LMWPc
- Pfam: PF01451
- InterPro: IPR017867
- SMART: SM00226
- SCOP2: 1phr / SCOPe / SUPFAM
- CDD: cd00115
Available protein structures:
- PDB: 1bvh, 1c0e, 1d1p, 1d1q, 1d2a, 1dg9, 1jf8, 1jfv, 1jl3, 1ljl IPR017867 PF01451 (ECOD; PDBsum)
- AlphaFold: IPR017867; PF01451

Protein-tyrosine phosphatase
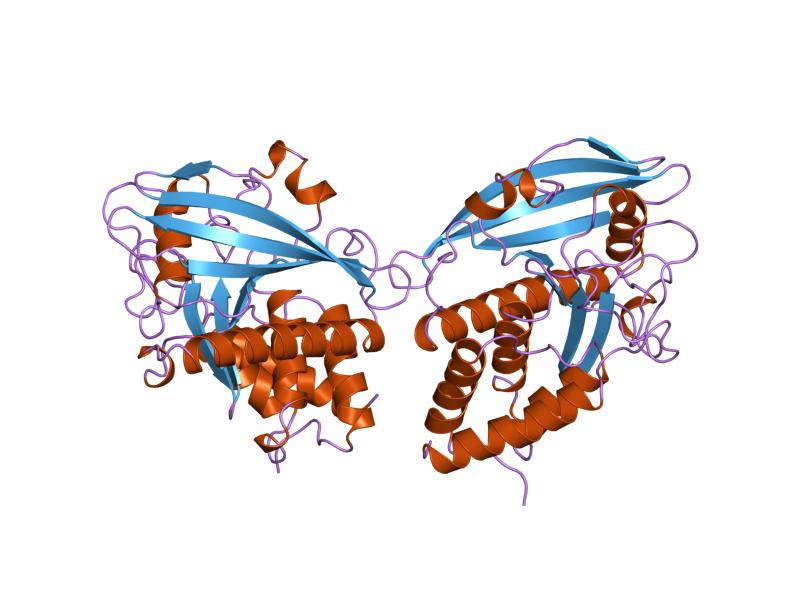
- Structure of Yersinia protein tyrosine phosphatase.

Identifiers
- Symbol: Y_phosphatase
- Pfam: PF00102
- Pfam clan: CL0031
- InterPro: IPR000242
- SMART: SM00194
- PROSITE: PS50055
- SCOP2: 1ypt / SCOPe / SUPFAM
- CDD: cd00047
Available protein structures:
- PDB: 1a5y, 1aax, 1bzc, 1bzh, 1bzj, 1c83, 1c84, 1c85, 1c86, 1c87 IPR000242 PF00102 (ECOD; PDBsum)
- AlphaFold: IPR000242; PF00102

Dual-specificity phosphatase, catalytic domain
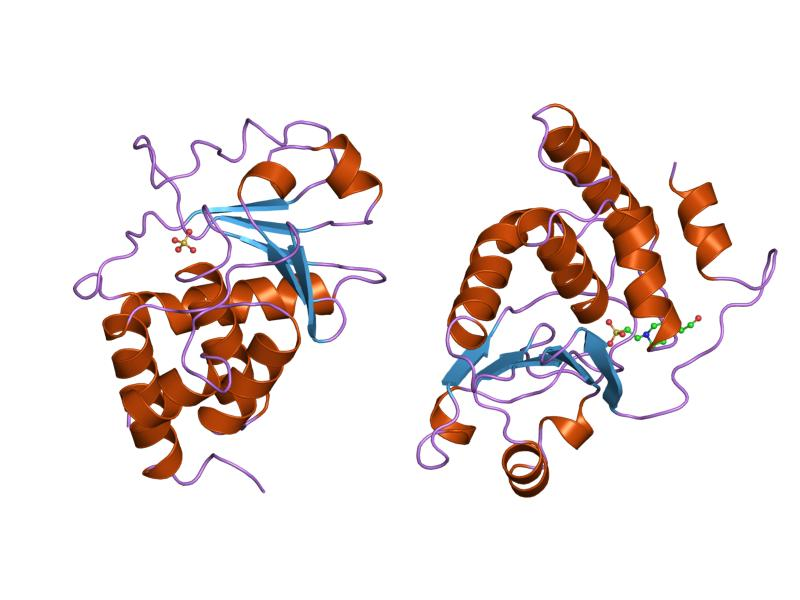
- Structure of the dual-specificity protein phosphatase VHR.

Identifiers
- Symbol: DSPc
- Pfam: PF00782
- Pfam clan: CL0031
- InterPro: IPR000340
- PROSITE: PDOC00323
- SCOP2: 1vhr / SCOPe / SUPFAM
- CDD: cd14498
Available protein structures:
- PDB: 1d5r, 1i9s, 1i9t, 1j4x, 1m3g, 1mkp, 1ohc, 1ohd, 1ohe, 2c46 IPR000340 PF00782 (ECOD; PDBsum)
- AlphaFold: IPR000340; PF00782

Protein-tyrosine phosphatase, SIW14-like
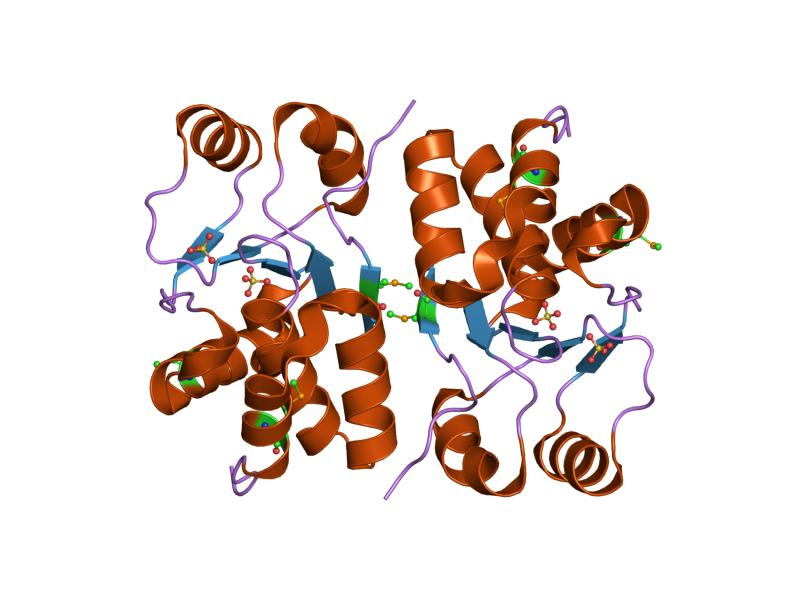
- Structure of a putative phosphoprotein phosphatase from Arabidopsis thaliana.

Identifiers
- Symbol: Y_phosphatase2
- Pfam: PF03162
- Pfam clan: CL0031
- InterPro: IPR004861
- CDD: cd14528
Available protein structures:
- PDB: 1xri, 2q47 IPR004861 PF03162 (ECOD; PDBsum)
- AlphaFold: IPR004861; PF03162

Protein-tyrosine phosphatase-like, PTPLA

Identifiers
- Symbol: PTPLA
- Pfam: PF04387
- InterPro: IPR007482
Available protein structures:
- PDB: IPR007482 PF04387 (ECOD; PDBsum)
- AlphaFold: IPR007482; PF04387

== Expression pattern ==
Individual PTPs may be expressed by all cell types, or their expression may be strictly tissue-specific. Most cells express 30% to 60% of all the PTPs, however hematopoietic and neuronal cells express a higher number of PTPs in comparison to other cell types. T cells and B cells of hematopoietic origin express around 60 to 70 different PTPs. The expression of several PTPS is restricted to hematopoietic cells, for example, LYP, SHP1, CD45, and HePTP. The expression of PTPN5 is restricted to the brain, and differs between brain regions, with no expression in the cerebellum. Some tyrosine phosphatases show marked expression in expression in cancer, e.g. an analysis of The Cancer Genome Atlas showed that the tyrosine phosphatase ACP1 is consistently upregulated in gastric and colorectal cancers and can even be used as a biomarker for stomach cancer.

== Sources ==
- This article incorporates text from the public domain Pfam and InterPro: IPR000106
