= SPR domain =

Sprouty

Identifiers
- Symbol: SPR
- Pfam: PF05210
- InterPro: IPR007875
Available protein structures:
- PDB: IPR007875 PF05210 (ECOD; PDBsum)
- AlphaFold: IPR007875; PF05210

In molecular biology the SPR domain is a protein domain found in the Sprouty (Spry) and Spred (Sprouty related EVH1 domain) proteins. These have been identified as inhibitors of the Ras/mitogen-activated protein kinase (MAPK) cascade, a pathway crucial for developmental processes initiated by activation of various receptor tyrosine kinases. These proteins share a conserved, C-terminal cysteine-rich region, the SPR domain. This domain has been defined as a novel cytosol to membrane translocation domain. It has been found to be a PtdIns(4,5)P2-binding domain that targets the proteins to a cellular localization that maximizes their inhibitory potential. It also mediates homodimer formation of these proteins.

The SPR domain can occur in association with the WH1 domain (see InterPro: IPR000697) (located in the N-terminus) in the Spred proteins.

== Examples ==
Human genes encoding protein containing the SPR domain include:

- SPRED1, SPRED2, SPRED3, SPRY1, SPRY2, SPRY3, SPRY4
