= Neurofibromatosis =

Three genetic disorders involving benign tumors of the nervous system

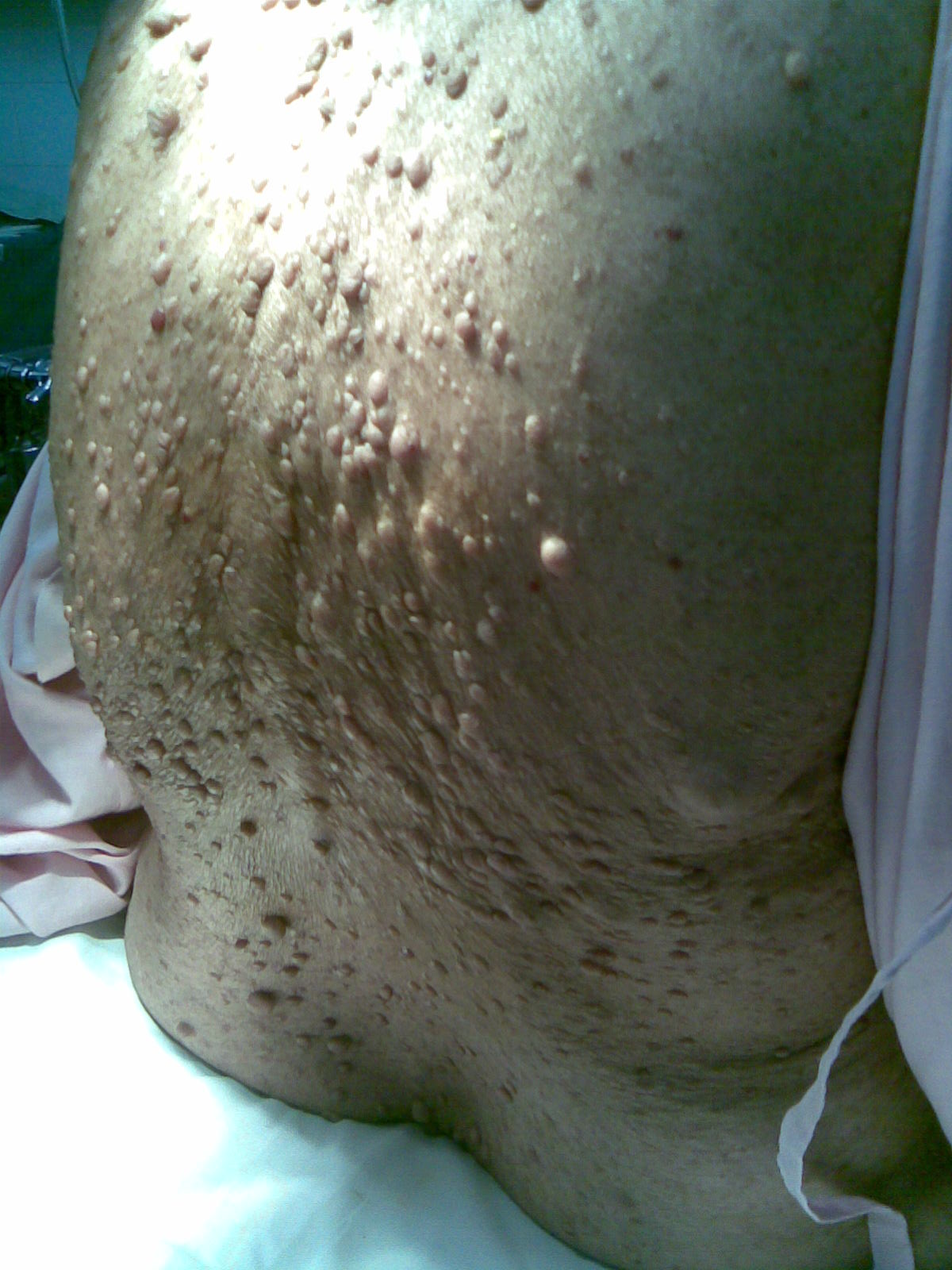
- Back of an elderly woman with neurofibromatosis type 1
- Specialty: Neurosurgery, neurology, Neuro-oncology
- Symptoms: Small lumps within the skin, scoliosis, hearing loss, vision loss
- Usual onset: Birth to early adulthood
- Duration: Life long
- Types: Neurofibromatosis type 1 (NF1), neurofibromatosis type 2 (NF2), schwannomatosis
- Causes: Genetic
- Diagnostic method: Symptoms, genetic testing
- Treatment: Surgery, radiation therapy
- Prognosis: NF1: variable, but most of the time normal life expectancy NF2: shortened life expectancy
- Frequency: 1 in 3,000 people (United States)

Neurofibromatosis (NF) refers to a group of three distinct genetic conditions in which tumors grow in the nervous system. Most tumors are benign, but some are cancerous. They often involve the skin or surrounding bone. Symptoms are often mild, and each condition presents differently. Neurofibromatosis type I (NF1) is typically characterised by café au lait spots (flat patches of light brown skin), neurofibromas (small bumps in or under the skin), scoliosis (sideways curvature of the spine), and headaches. Neurofibromatosis type II (NF2) may present with early-onset hearing loss, cataracts, tinnitus, difficulty walking or maintaining balance, and muscle atrophy. The third type is schwannomatosis and often presents in early adulthood with widespread pain, numbness, or tingling due to nerve compression.

The cause is a genetic mutation in certain oncogenes. About half of cases are inherited, and half spontaneously occur during early development. Different mutations result in the three types of NF. Neurofibromatosis arises from the supporting cells of the nervous system rather than the neurons themselves. In NF1, the tumors are neurofibromas (tumors of the peripheral nerves). In NF2 and schwannomatosis, tumors of Schwann cells are more common. Diagnosis is typically based on symptoms, examination, medical imaging, and biopsy. Genetic testing may rarely be done to support the diagnosis.

There is no known prevention or cure. Tumors that are causing problems or have become cancerous may be surgically removed, or treated with Radiation and chemotherapy. A cochlear implant or auditory brainstem implant may help with hearing loss.

In the United States, about 1 in 3,500 people have NF1 and 1 in 25,000 have NF2. Males and females are affected equally often. In NF1, symptoms are often present at birth or develop before 10 years of age. While the condition typically worsens with time, most people with NF1 have a normal life expectancy. In NF2, symptoms may not become apparent until early adulthood. NF2 increases the risk of early death. Descriptions of the condition occur as far back as the 1st century. It was formally described by Friedrich Daniel von Recklinghausen in 1882, after whom it was previously named "von Recklinghausen's disease".

== Signs and symptoms ==
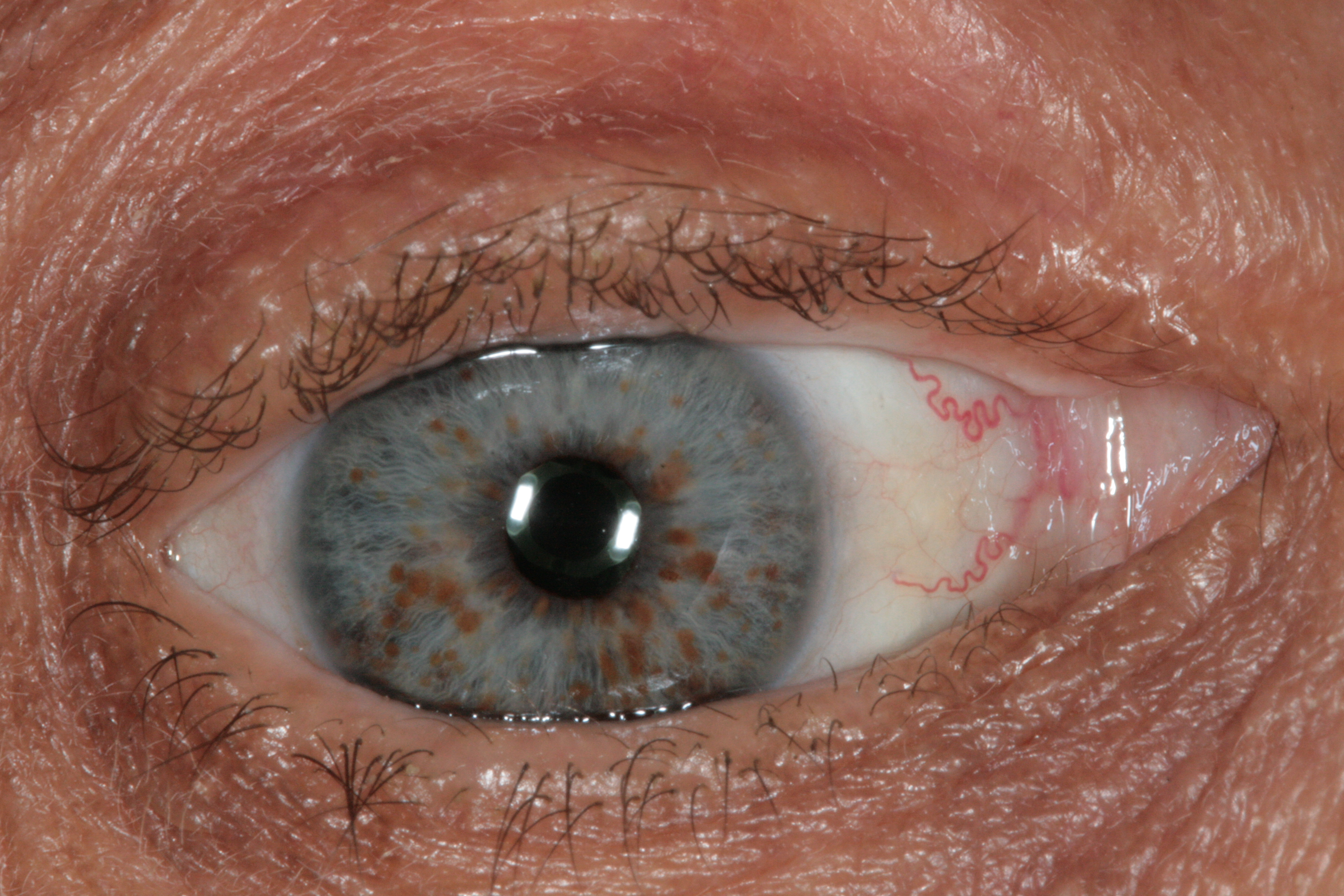
Lisch nodules as seen in NF1

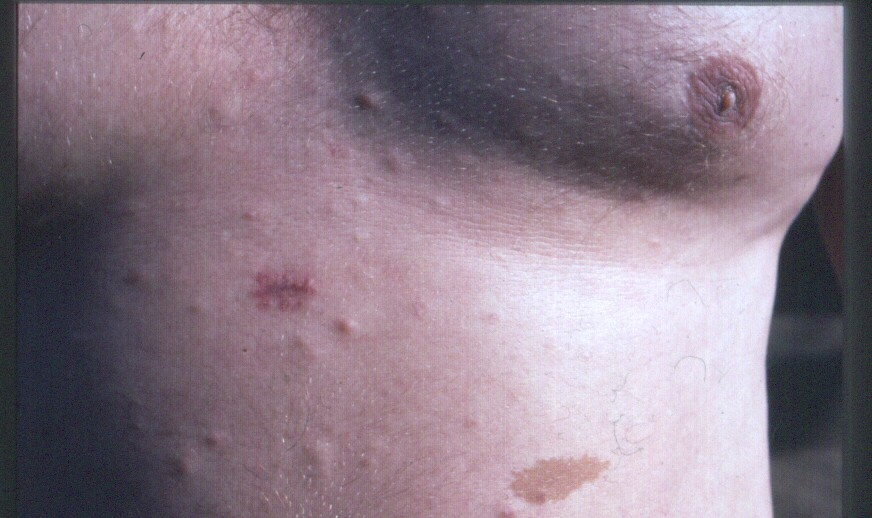
Person with multiple small neurofibromas in the skin and a "café au lait spot" (bottom of photo, to the right of centre). A biopsy has been taken of one of the lesions.

Neurofibromatosis type 1 in early life may cause learning and behavior problems – about 60% of children who have NF1 have mild difficulty in school. Signs of the condition include:

- Six or more light brown dermatological spots ("café au lait spots")
- At least two neurofibromas
- At least two growths on the eye's iris
- Abnormal growth of the spine (scoliosis)
- Lisch nodules
- Tumors on the adrenal glands (pheochromocytomas)

Neurofibromatosis type 2 may or may not exhibit the same skin symptoms as type 1. Symptoms may also include pain due to pressure on nerves, tinnitus, weakness in fingers, numbness, headaches, and - the symptom most characteristic of NF2 - hearing loss due to the pressure of tumors on the acoustic nerve. The same pressure can cause headaches, dizziness, and nausea.

The main symptom of schwannomatosis is localized pain due to pressure from tumors on tissues and nerves.

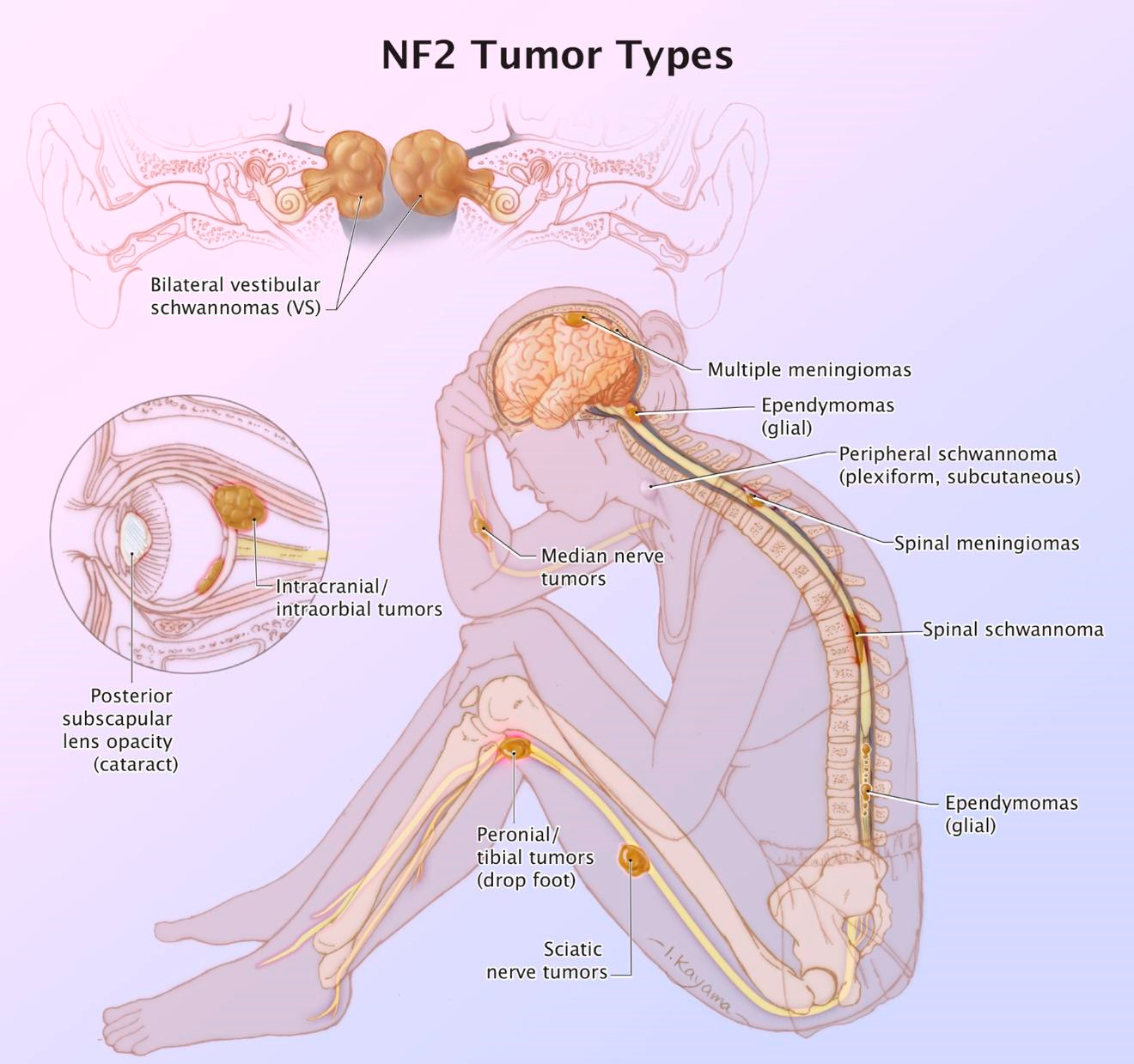
Morbidities associated with neurofibromatosis type II

== Cause ==
Autosomal dominant inheritance pattern

The three types of neurofibromatosis are caused by different mutations on chromosomes. NF1 is caused by a mutation on the NF1 gene on the arm of chromosome 17. NF2 is caused by a mutation on the NF2 tumor suppressor gene on chromosome 22. Schwannomatosis is caused by mutations on chromosome 22.

Neurofibromatosis is an autosomal dominant disorder, which means only one copy of the affected gene is needed for the disorder to develop. If one parent has neurofibromatosis, their children have a 50% chance of developing the condition. The severity of the parent's condition is not relevant, the parent may have a severe form of the disorder and the child a mild form, or vice versa. The types of neurofibromatosis are:

- Neurofibromatosis type I, in which the nerve tissue grows tumors (neurofibromas) that may be benign, but may still cause serious damage by compressing nerves and other tissues.
- Neurofibromatosis type II, in which bilateral acoustic neuromas (tumors of the vestibulocochlear nerve or cranial nerve 8 (CN VIII) also known as schwannoma) develop, often leading to hearing loss.
- Schwannomatosis, in which painful schwannomas develop on spinal and peripheral nerves.

== Pathophysiology ==
The pathophysiology is varied, and each NF type has a different one:

- Neurofibromatosis type I is the most common of the three types and is caused by genetic changes in the NF1 gene located on chromosome 17 (17q11.2). This gene encodes a cytoplasmic protein known the neurofibromin, which functions as a tumor suppressor and therefore serves as a signal regulator of cell proliferation and differentiation. A dysfunction or lack of neurofibromin can affect regulation, and cause uncontrolled cell proliferation, leading to the tumors (neurofibromas) that characterize NF1. The neurofibromas caused by NF consist of Schwann cells, fibroblasts, perineuronal cells, mast cells and axons embedded in an extracellular matrix. Another function of neurofibromin is to bind to microtubules that play a role in the release of adenylyl cyclase and its activity. Adenylyl cyclase plays an essential role in cognition. Neurofibromin's role in the activity of adenylyl cyclase explains why patients with NF experience cognitive impairment.
- Neurofibromatosis type II is caused by a mutation on chromosome 22 (22q12). The mutation falls on the NF2 tumor suppressor gene. The gene normally encodes a cytoplasmic protein known as merlin. The normal function of merlin is to regulate the activity of multiple growth factors, the mutated copy of the gene leads to merlin's loss of function. The loss of function leads to increased activity of growth factors normally regulated by merlin, leading to the formation of the tumors associated with NF2.
- Schwannomatosis is caused by a mutation on the SMARCB1 gene. This gene is located near the NF2 tumor suppressor gene leading to the thought that schwannomatosis and NF2 were the same condition. The two conditions show different mutations on two different genes. The normal function of the SMARCB1 gene is to encode a protein called SMARCB1 that is part of a larger protein complex whose function is not completely understood. The complex including SMARCB1 plays a role in tumor suppression. The mutation of the SMARCB1 gene causes a loss of function in the complex leading to the formation of tumors indicative of schwannomatosis.

== Diagnosis ==
The neurofibromatoses are considered as RASopathies and as members of the neurocutaneous syndromes (phakomatoses). The diagnosis of neurofibromatosis is done via the following means:

- Radiograph
- MRI or CT scan
- EEG
- Slit-lamp examination
- Genetic testing
- Histology

=== Differential diagnosis ===
Conditions similar to NF include:

- LEOPARD syndrome
- Legius syndrome
- Proteus syndrome
- Macrodystrophia lipomatosa
- Klippel–Trénaunay syndrome
- Parkes Weber syndrome

== Treatment ==
Surgical removal of tumors is an option; however, the risks involved should be assessed first. With regard to OPG (optic pathway gliomas), the preferred treatment is chemotherapy. However, radiotherapy is not recommended in children who present with this disorder. It is recommended that children diagnosed with NF1 at an early age have an examination each year, which allows any potential growths or changes related to the disorder to be monitored.

== Prognosis ==
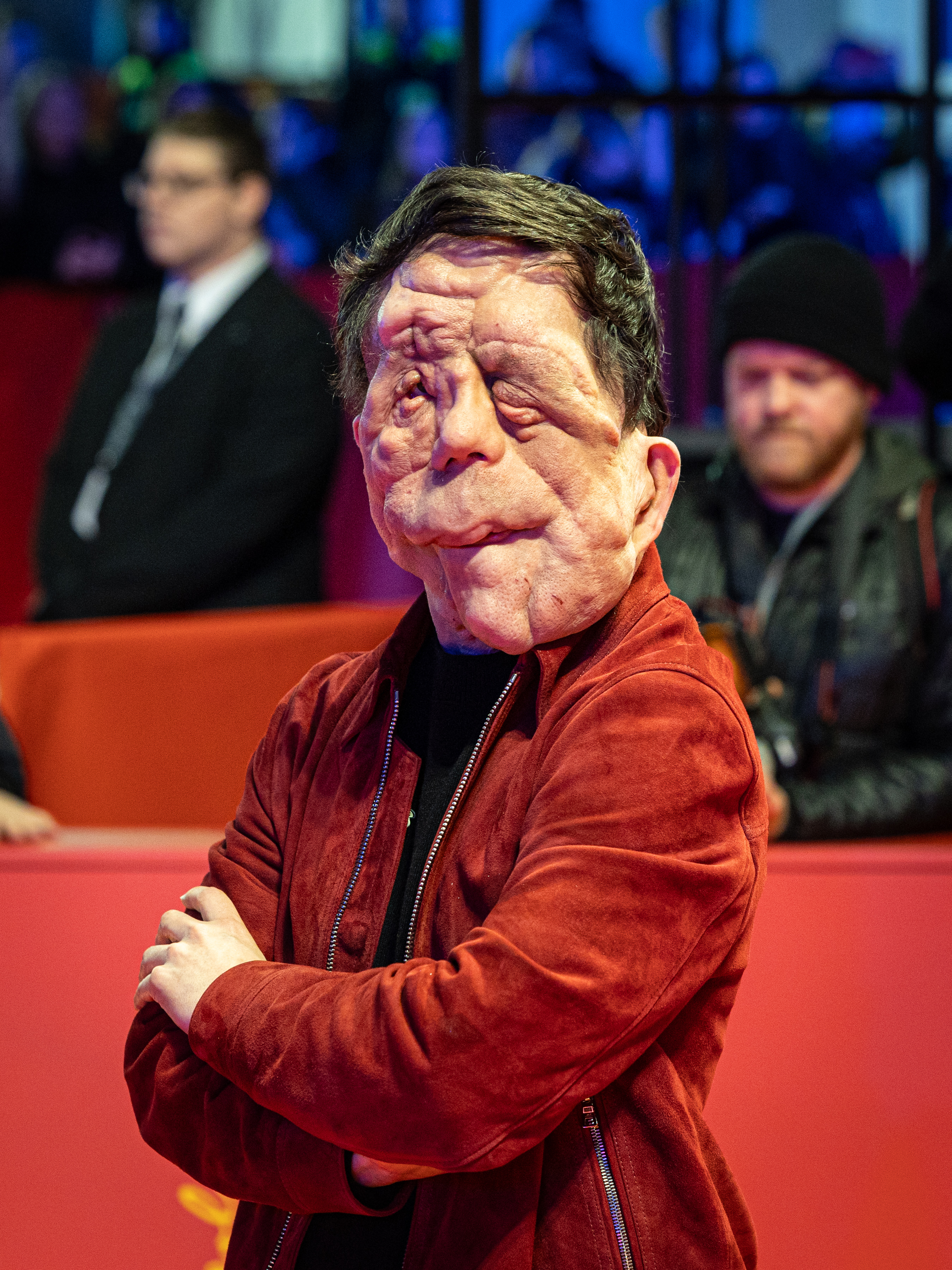
Adam Pearson, a British actor with neurofibromatosis

In most cases, symptoms of NF1 are mild, and individuals live normal and productive lives. In some cases, however, NF1 can be severely debilitating and may cause cosmetic and psychological issues. The course of NF2 varies greatly among individuals. In some cases of NF2, the damage to nearby vital structures, such as other cranial nerves and the brain stem, can be life-threatening. Most individuals with schwannomatosis have significant pain. In some extreme cases, the pain will be severe and disabling.

== Epidemiology ==
In the United States, about 1 in 3,500 people have NF1, 1 in 25,000 have NF2, and 1 in 40,000 have schwannomatosis. Males and females are affected equally often in all three conditions. In NF1, symptoms are often present at birth or develop before 10 years of age. While the condition typically worsens with time, most people with NF1 have a normal life expectancy. In NF2, symptoms may not become apparent until early adulthood. NF2 increases the risk of early death. Schwannomatosis symptoms develop in early childhood and can worsen with time. Typically life expectancy is unaffected in those with schwannomatosis.

== History ==
Descriptions of what is believed to be the condition go as far back as the 1st century. The conditions were formally described by Friedrich Daniel von Recklinghausen in 1882, after whom it was previously named.
