= Familial multiple cafe-au-lait spots =

- Other names: Neurofibromatosis type 6, autosomal dominant multiple cafe au lait spots, familial cafe au lait spots
- Specialty: Medical genetics, dermatology
- Causes: Genetic mutation
- Prevention: none
- Prognosis: Good
- Frequency: Unknown; although a small number of families have been officially described in medical literature, it does not mean that there are not any more families with this disorder in the world.
- Deaths: -

Familial multiple cafe au lait spots, also known as autosomal dominant multiple cafe au lait spots or neurofibromatosis type 6, is a rare, cutaneous genetic disorder which is characterized by the hereditary cutaneous presence of several cafe-au-lait spots without any other symptoms of neurofibromatosis. Sporadic cases may be called "sporadic multiple cafe au lait spots". Few cases have been described in medical literature, although it is estimated that the presence of multiple cafe au lait spots without NF1 is rare (but not extremely rare) among the general population.

== History ==
It was first discovered when Riccardi et al. described multiple families with cafe-au-lait spots and no association for neurofibromatosis in 1980.

In 1993, Charrow et al. described five members from a four-generation family who had the characteristic tell-tale sign of neurofibromatosis, multiple cafe au lait spots; however, testing of the gene usually involved in neurofibromatosis revealed it to be normal. They proposed the name for this condition.

In 1993, Brunner et al. tested the NF1 locus on a small 2-generation family with MCALS affecting three of its members (a woman and her two daughters), and they found that the woman and her daughters had a mutation in the same NF1 locus that was different from the one that causes neurofibromatosis type I itself.

In 1994, Arnsmeier et al. described twelve patients from three unrelated families; one of the families had axillary and inguinal freckles and Lisch nodes. All three families had no other signs of neurofibromatosis type I.
