= RASopathy =

Family of genetic conditions caused by mutations affecting Ras genes

The RASopathies are a group of developmental syndromes caused by germline mutations in genes belonging to the Ras/MAPK pathway. Common features include intellectual disability, congenital heart defects, skin abnormalities, and craniofacial abnormalities.

== MAPK pathway ==
The most prevalent signaling cascade governed by multi-kinase inhibitors is the mitogen-activated protein kinase (MAPK) pathway. This well-established MAPK pathway in cell biology governs several crucial cellular. It encompasses the RAS/RAF/MEK/ERK signaling cascade. RAF kinase is a primary mediator of the MAPK pathway, responsible for the sequential activation of downstream targets, such as MEK pathway and the transcription factor extracellular signal-related kinase (ERK), which control numerous cellular and physiological processes, including organism development, cell cycle control, cell proliferation, differentiation, migration, survival, apoptosis and cell death. With this cascade, various isoforms of RAS, RAF, MEK, and ERK exhibit differences in efficacy, function, and, notably, carcinogenic potential. Defects in this signaling cascade are associated with diseases. The pathophysiology of NF1, Noonan, Watson and Legius syndromes fit into the RASopathy model. The RASopathies are a group of developmental syndromes caused by germline mutations in genes belonging to the Ras/MAPK pathway. Costello Syndrome and Cardiofaciocutaneous syndrome are also included in RASopathy. Common features include intellectual disability, congenital heart defects, skin abnormalities, craniofacial abnormalities and tendency for tumor formation.

== List of RASopathies ==
Known RASopathies include the following:

- Capillary malformation-AV malformation syndrome (CV-AVM)
- Cardiofaciocutaneous syndrome (CFC)
- Neurofibromatosis type I (NF1)
- Watson syndrome
- Noonan syndrome (NS)
- Costello syndrome (CS)
- Legius syndrome, also known as NF1-like syndrome
- Noonan syndrome with multiple lentigines (NSML), formerly called LEOPARD syndrome
- SYNGAP1-related intellectual disability

Somatic mutations in the Ras/MAPK pathway can cause cancers and disorders such as RAS-associated autoimmune leukoproliferative disorder (RALD) or juvenile myelomonocytic leukemia (JMML). These syndromes may share some features with RASopathies but are not considered true RASopathies if caused by somatic mutation. Generally, RASopathies increase the risk of developing cancers. Neurodevelopmental or psychiatric disorders such as attention deficit hyperactivity disorder, autism spectrum disorder, and anxiety occur at higher rates in individuals with RASopathies.

== Genetics ==
RASopathies are caused by germline mutations which result in overall activation of the Ras/MAPK pathway. Mutations in the following genes are associated with one or more types of RASopathy:

- HRAS
- KRAS
- NRAS
- RRAS
- RIT1
- NF1
- RASA1
- RASA2
- SYNGAP1
- SOS1
- SOS2
- CBL
- PTPN11
- BRAF
- RAF1
- MAP2K1
- MAP2K2
- MAP3K8
- SPRED1
- SPRY1
- MYST4
- LZTR1
- A2ML1
