= NFLS =

NFLS may refer to:

- Nanjing Foreign Language School, in Nanjing, Jiangsu, China
- Noord-Friesche Locaalspoorweg-Maatschappij ('North Friesland Local Railway Company'), in the Netherlands

== See also ==
- Legius syndrome, also known as Neurofibromatosis 1-like syndrome, a genetic disorder
