= List of conditions associated with café au lait macules =

A number of diseases/syndromes of the human body may be associated with the development of café au lait macules:

- Ataxia–telangiectasia
- Bloom syndrome
- Fanconi anemia
- Gaucher's disease
- Legius syndrome
- Marfan syndrome
- McCune–Albright syndrome
- Multiple endocrine neoplasia type 1
- Neurofibromatosis type I
- Legius syndrome (Neurofibromatosis type 1-like syndrome)
- Noonan syndrome
- Peutz–Jeghers syndrome
- Silver–Russell syndrome
- Tuberous sclerosis
- Von Hippel–Lindau disease

== See also ==
- List of skin conditions
- List of allergens
- List of cutaneous conditions associated with increased risk of nonmelanoma skin cancer
- List of cutaneous conditions associated with internal malignancy
- List of cutaneous conditions caused by mutations in keratins
- List of cutaneous conditions caused by problems with junctional proteins
- List of dental abnormalities associated with cutaneous conditions
- List of genes mutated in cutaneous conditions
- List of histologic stains that aid in diagnosis of cutaneous conditions
- List of immunofluorescence findings for autoimmune bullous conditions
- List of inclusion bodies that aid in diagnosis of cutaneous conditions
- List of keratins expressed in the human integumentary system
- List of radiographic findings associated with cutaneous conditions
- List of specialized glands within the human integumentary system
- List of target antigens in pemphigoid
- List of target antigens in pemphigus
