= Schwannomatosis =

Rare genetic disorder

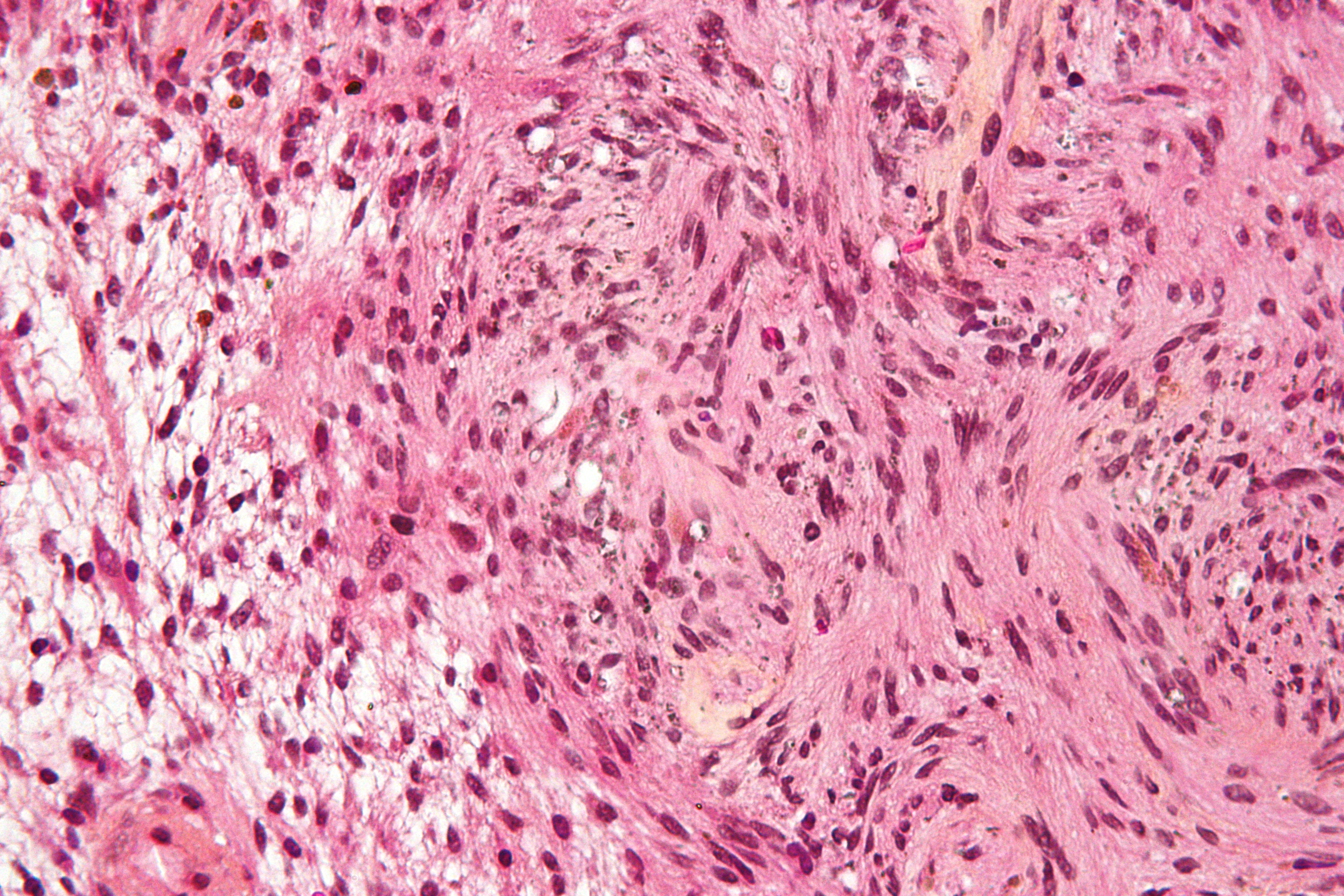
- Micrograph of a schwannoma
- Specialty: Oncology

Schwannomatosis (SWN) is a group of rare genetic disorders characterized by the development of multiple benign nerve sheath tumors called schwannomas. These tumors arise from Schwann cells, which form the myelin sheath surrounding peripheral nerves. Schwannomatosis is part of the broader group of conditions collectively referred to as neurofibromatosis (NF), which includes neurofibromatosis type 1 (NF1) and all forms of schwannomatosis, including NF2-related schwannomatosis (NF2-SWN), previously called neurofibromatosis type 2.

Schwannomatosis is considered the least common form within the neurofibromatosis spectrum. It affects approximately 1 in 20,000 individuals, with NF2-related schwannomatosis representing the most common subtype. When NF2-related schwannomatosis is excluded, the remaining forms occur in approximately 1 in 70,000 individuals.

Individuals with schwannomatosis develop schwannomas along nerves in the central nervous system (brain and spinal cord) and on peripheral nerves throughout the body. Although schwannomas are typically benign, they may cause neurological symptoms depending on their location, including pain, numbness, weakness, and hearing loss.

== Cause ==
The candidate schwannomatosis gene, named SMARCB1, is a tumor suppressor gene that regulates cell cycle, growth and differentiation. An inactivating germline mutation in exon 1 of the tumor suppressor gene SMARCB1 has been reported in patients with schwannomatosis. It is located on chromosome 22, a short distance from the NF2 gene. However, molecular analysis of the NF2 gene in schwannomatosis patients has shown the presence of inactivating mutations in the tumor cells, but no evidence of the germline mutations that are found in NF2 patients.

A mechanism involving both the SMARCB1 and NF2 genes may be responsible for the development of the disease because tumor analysis of schwannomas indicates the presence of inactivating mutations in both the SMARCB1 and NF2 genes. However, there is speculation about the involvement of an unidentified schwannomatosis gene(s) in most cases. This is because one study found no SMARCB1 germinal mutations in patients with familial schwannomatosis. Some schwannomatosis patients do not have SMARCB1 or NF2 mutations. Furthermore, many patients exhibit somatic mosaicism for mutations in the NF2 or SMARCB1 gene, which means that some somatic cells have the mutation and some do not in the same patient. Ultimately, the tumorigenesis of schwannomas is not solely dependent on one gene locus alone. In regard to the SMARCB1 and NF2 genes, it is important to understand constitutional mutations and somatic mutations. Constitutional mutations are the first inactivation events that are often small mutations, such as point mutations and deletion/insertion of single base pairs. Somatic mutations are the second mutations that occur and may also be another small mutation or the loss of the remaining allele of the gene. Schwannomas from one patient share the same constitutional mutations but have distinct somatic mutations. In addition, the constitutional mutation may be present in non-tumor tissue.

SMARCB1 is also known as INI1, hSNF5, or BAF47. SMARCB1 is mutated in additional tumors including malignant brain & kidney tumors in children. It seems that heterozygotes for mutations in the SMARCB1 gene have an increased risk of developing a malignant kidney tumor in early childhood but if they survive to adulthood, they may be predisposed to the development of schwannomas. One schwannomatosis patient had a mutation in exon 2 of the SMARCB1 gene. Another patient exhibited a novel germline deletion of the SMARCB1 gene, because most SMARCB1 mutations are point or frameshift. In this patient, genetic analysis from different schwannomas indicated inactivation of both the SMARCB1 and NF2 genes. Schwannomatosis is known to be a genetic disorder. However, familial occurrence is inexplicably rare.

== Diagnosis ==
=== Prenatal ===
Schwannomatosis can be tested prenatally on the NHS.

=== Postnatal ===
Ferner et al. give the following diagnostic criteria for Schwannomatosis:

- Definite
  - Age >30 years and ≥2 nonintradermal schwannomas, at least one with histologic confirmation and no evidence of vestibular tumor on MRI scan and no known NF mutation, or
  - One nonvestibular schwannoma plus a first-degree relative with schwannomatosis
- Possible
  - Age <30 and ≥2 nonintradermal schwannomas, at least one with histologic confirmation and no evidence of vestibular tumor on MRI scan and no known NF mutation, or
  - Age >45 and ≥2 nonintradermal schwannomas, at least one with histologic confirmation and no symptoms of 8th nerve dysfunction and no NF2, or
  - Nonvestibular schwannoma and first-degree relative with schwannomatosis
- Segmental. Diagnosed as definite or possible but limited to one limb or ≤5 contiguous segments of spine.

Another set of criteria are:

- Two or more nonintradermal (cutaneous) schwannomas
- No evidence of vestibular tumor
- No known NF-2 mutation

or

- One pathologically confirmed nonvestibular schwannoma plus a first degree relative who meets the above criteria.

== Treatment ==
- Schwannomatosis patients represent 2.4% to 5% of patients undergoing surgical resection of their schwannomas.
- In isolated regions of the body schwannomas are small and difficult to locate. Intraoperative sonography offers invaluable assistance in such cases by localizing small schwannomas and decreasing operative time and extent of the surgical incision.
- If feasible, the schwannomas can be surgically removed. Any tumor-associated pain usually subsides after tumor removal. Damaged nerves and scar tissue can be a result of surgery and pain can be an ongoing problem.
- Sometimes, a tumor will reappear at the same site after surgery.
- If surgery is unfeasible, then pain management will have to be used. Schwannomatosis can sometimes cause severe, untreatable pain over time.
- Other than surgery and pain management, there are no other medical treatments available. There are no drugs available to treat schwannomatosis.
- Gamma knife radiosurgery can be performed on head tumors to help stop growth of a tumor, although there is no guarantee that it will work. The University of Pittsburgh published their experience with over 829 cases and reported 97% of patients had long term tumor control (defined as requiring no further treatment) with gamma knife radiosurgery.
- Recently, many advances are being made in the treatment of schwannomas. Of interest is CyberKnife, manufactured by Accuray. Success rates, although limited in data, appear to be in the low to mid ninety percent range.
- As most schwannomas are benign, many doctors will take the "watch and wait" approach and leave the tumors alone until they start causing harmful side effects. Schwannomatosis patients have multiple tumors and the risks of having so many surgeries outweigh the benefits.

== Prognosis ==
Many of the symptoms of schwannomatosis overlap with NF2.

- Schwannomas occur instead of the neurofibromas that are hallmarks of neurofibromatosis Type 1 (NF1).
- Multiple schwannomas manifest throughout the body or in isolated regions.
- The schwannomas develop on cranial, spinal and peripheral nerves.
- Chronic pain, and sometimes numbness, tingling and weakness.
- About 1/3 of patients have segmental schwannomatosis, which means that the schwannomas are limited to a single part of the body, such as an arm, a leg or the spine.
- There are several cases where people with schwannomatosis have developed a vestibular schwannoma (acoustic neuroma). An acoustic neuroma is a schwannoma on the vestibular nerve in the brain. This nerve is involved in hearing and patients with vestibular schwannomas experience hearing loss. However, bilateral vestibular schwannomas (vestibular schwannomas on both sides of the brain) do not occur in schwannomatosis. Juvenile vestibular tumors do not occur either.
- Patients with schwannomatosis do not have learning disabilities related to the disease.
- Symptoms are sometimes brought on by hormonal changes such as puberty and pregnancy.
