= SPRED1 =

Protein-coding gene in the species Homo sapiens

Identifiers
- Aliases: SPRED1, NFLS, PPP1R147, hSpred1, spred-1, sprouty related EVH1 domain containing 1, LGSS
- External IDs: OMIM: 609291; MGI: 2150016; GeneCards: SPRED1
Available structures
PDB	Ortholog search: PDBe RCSB
PDB	List of PDB id codes 3SYX

Gene location (Human)
Chr.	Chromosome 15 (human)
Band	15q14	Start	38,252,836 bp
Band	15q14	End	38,357,249 bp

Gene location (Mouse)
Chr.	Chromosome 2 (mouse)
Band	2|2 E5	Start	116,951,855 bp
Band	2|2 E5	End	117,012,760 bp
RNA expression pattern
Bgee	Human / Mouse (ortholog); Top expressed in: ventricular zone; mucosa of sigmoid colon; Achilles tendon; entorhinal cortex; lower lobe of lung; germinal epithelium; epithelium of colon; pancreatic epithelial cell; cartilage tissue; Brodmann area 46 / Top expressed in: condyle; primitive streak; fossa; Region I of hippocampus proper; dorsomedial hypothalamic nucleus; substantia nigra; primary motor cortex; cingulate gyrus; suprachiasmatic nucleus; olfactory tubercle; More reference expression data
BioGPS	n/a
Gene ontology
Molecular function	protein serine/threonine kinase inhibitor activity; phosphatase binding; stem cell factor receptor binding; protein binding; protein kinase binding
Cellular component	membrane; plasma membrane; caveola; cytosol; nucleus; cytoplasmic vesicle
Biological process	negative regulation of phosphatase activity; negative regulation of peptidyl-threonine phosphorylation; regulation of protein deacetylation; MAPK cascade; multicellular organism development; fibroblast growth factor receptor signaling pathway; regulation of signal transduction; positive regulation of DNA damage response, signal transduction by p53 class mediator; vasculogenesis involved in coronary vascular morphogenesis; negative regulation of cell migration involved in sprouting angiogenesis; negative regulation of MAPK cascade; negative regulation of protein kinase activity; negative regulation of angiogenesis; regulation of MAPK cascade; negative regulation of ERK1 and ERK2 cascade
Sources:Amigo / QuickGO
Orthologs
Databases	NCBI: entry; OMA: entry
Species	Human	Mouse
Entrez	161742	114715
Ensembl	ENSG00000166068	ENSMUSG00000027351
UniProt	Q7Z699	Q924S8
RefSeq (mRNA)	NM_152594	NM_001277256; NM_033524
RefSeq (protein)	NP_689807	NP_001264185; NP_277059
Location (UCSC)	Chr 15: 38.25 – 38.36 Mb	Chr 2: 116.95 – 117.01 Mb
PubMed search
- Wikidata
View/Edit Human	View/Edit Mouse

Sprouty-related, EVH1 domain-containing protein 1 (pronounced spread-1) is a protein that in humans is encoded by the SPRED1 gene located on chromosome 15q13.2 and has seven coding exons.

== Function ==
SPRED-1 is a member of the Sprouty family of proteins and is phosphorylated by tyrosine kinase in response to several growth factors. The encoded protein can act as a homodimer or as a heterodimer with SPRED2 to regulate activation of the MAP kinase cascade.

== Clinical associations ==
Defects in this gene are a cause of neurofibromatosis type 1-like syndrome (NFLS).

Mutations in this gene are associated with

- Legius syndrome.
- Childhood leukemia

== Mutations ==
The following mutations have been observed:

- An exon 3 c.46C>T mutation leading to p.Arg16Stop. This mutation may result in a truncated nonfunctional protein. Blast cells analysis displayed the same abnormality as germline mutation with one mutated allele (no somatic SPRED1 single-point mutation or loss of heterozygosity was found). The M4/M5 phenotype of AML are most closely associated with Ras pathway mutations. Ras pathway mutations are also associated with monosomy 7.
- 3 Nonsense (R16X, E73X, R262X)
- 2 Frameshift (c.1048_c1049 delGG, c.149_1152del 4 bp)
- Missense (V44D)
- p.R18X and p.Q194X with phenotype altered pigmentation without tumoriginesis.

== Disease Database ==
SPRED1 gene variant database

== See also ==
- Neurofibromin 1
- Patients without Neurofibromin 1 or SPRED1 mutations may have SPRED2, SPRED3 or SPRY1, SPRY2, SPRY3 or SPRY4 mutations.
