= WH1 domain =

Identifiers
- Symbol: WH1
- Pfam: PF00568
- InterPro: IPR000697
- SMART: WH1
- SCOP2: 1evh / SCOPe / SUPFAM
- CDD: cd01205
Available protein structures:
- Pfam: structures / ECOD
- PDB: RCSB PDB; PDBe; PDBj
- PDBsum: structure summary

WH1 domains, also known as EVH1 domains, are evolutionary conserved protein domains found on WASP (VASP) proteins, which are often involved in actin polymerization.

== Function ==
WH1 domains are important for all cellular processes involving actin, this includes cell motility, cell trafficking, cell division and cytokinesis, cell signalling, and the establishment and maintenance of cell junctions and cell shape.

== Structure ==
Tertiary structure of the WH1 domain of the Mena protein revealed structure similarities with the pleckstrin (PH) domain. The overall fold consists of a compact parallel beta-sandwich, closed along one edge by a long alpha helix. A highly conserved cluster of three surface-exposed aromatic side-chains forms the recognition site for the molecule's target ligands.

== Interactions ==
The WASP protein family control actin polymerization by activating the Arp2/3 complex. WASP is defective in Wiskott–Aldrich syndrome (WAS) whereby in most patient cases, the majority of point mutations occur within the N-terminal WH1 domain. The metabotropic glutamate receptors mGluR1alpha and mGluR5 bind a protein called homer, which is a WH1 domain homologue.

WASP family proteins contain an EVH1 (WH1) in their N-terminals which bind proline-rich sequences in the WASP interacting protein. Proteins of the RanBP1 family contain a WH1 domain in their N-terminal region, which seems to bind a different sequence motif present in the C-terminal part of RanGTP protein.

Tertiary structure of the WH1 domain of the Mena protein revealed structure similarities with the pleckstrin homology (PH) domain. The overall fold consists of a compact parallel beta-sandwich, closed along one edge by a long alpha-helix. A highly conserved cluster of three surface-exposed aromatic side-chains forms the recognition site for the molecules target ligands.

== EVH1 ==
EVH1
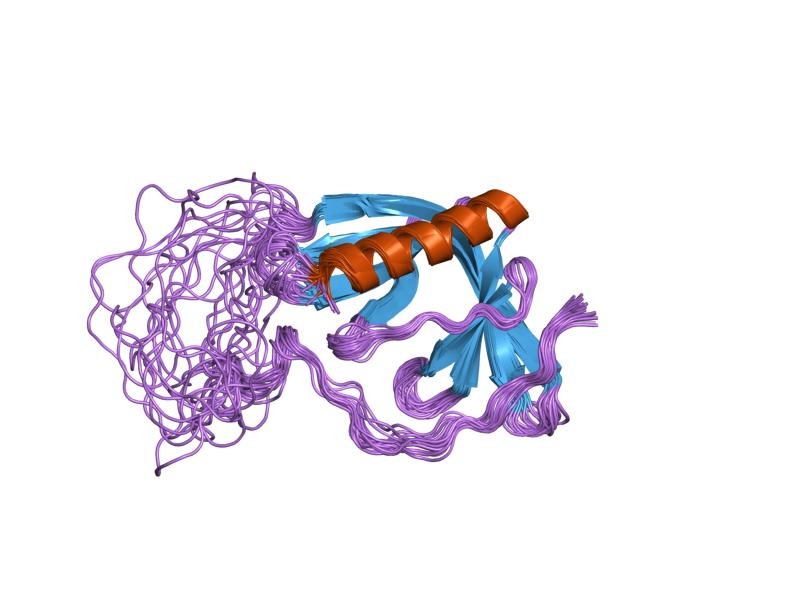
- structure of the n-wasp evh1 domain-wip complex

Identifiers
- Symbol: EVH1
- Pfam: PF00568
- Pfam clan: CL0266
- InterPro: IPR000697
- SMART: WH1
- SCOP2: 1evh / SCOPe / SUPFAM
- CDD: cd00837
Available protein structures:
- Pfam: structures / ECOD
- PDB: RCSB PDB; PDBe; PDBj
- PDBsum: structure summary

A subset of WH1 domains has been termed the EVH1 domain bind a polyproline motif. The EVH1 domain (also known as the WH1, RanBP1-WASP, or enabled/VASP homology 1 domain) is also an evolutionary conserved protein domain. EVH1 domains recognise and bind the proline-rich motif FPPPP with low-affinity, further interactions then form between flanking residues.

The EVH1 domain is found in multi-domain Ena/Vasp homology proteins implicated in a diverse range of signalling, nuclear transport and cytoskeletal events. This domain of around 115 amino acids is present in species ranging from yeast to mammals. Many EVH1-containing proteins associate with actin-based structures and play a role in cytoskeletal organisation. EVH1 domains recognise and bind the proline-rich motif FPPPP with low-affinity, further interactions then form between flanking residues.

== Examples ==
Human genes encoding proteins containing the WH1 (EVH1) domain include:

- ENAH, EVL
- HOMER1, HOMER2, HOMER3
- SPRED1, SPRED2, SPRED3
- VASP, WAS, WASL
