= Karl Lisch =

Austrian ophthalmologist

Karl Lisch (24 July 1907, Kirchbichl – 5 February 1999, Tyrol) was an Austrian ophthalmologist remembered for describing Lisch nodules in 1937.

== Biography ==
Karl Lisch studied medicine at Vienna, Zurich and Innsbruck, graduating in 1931. He worked in university eye clinics in Vienna, Innsbruck and Munich, and became the head of the eye department of the hospital in Wörgl in 1947. He remained there until he retired in 1980. He received the title Senior Adviser in Medical Affairs from the President of Austria in 1989, the Medal of Honor from the American Neurofibromatosis Society in 1992, and the First Class Cross Honor for Science and the Arts from the Austrian Ministry for Science and the Arts.
