= SPRY2 =

Protein-coding gene in the species Homo sapiens

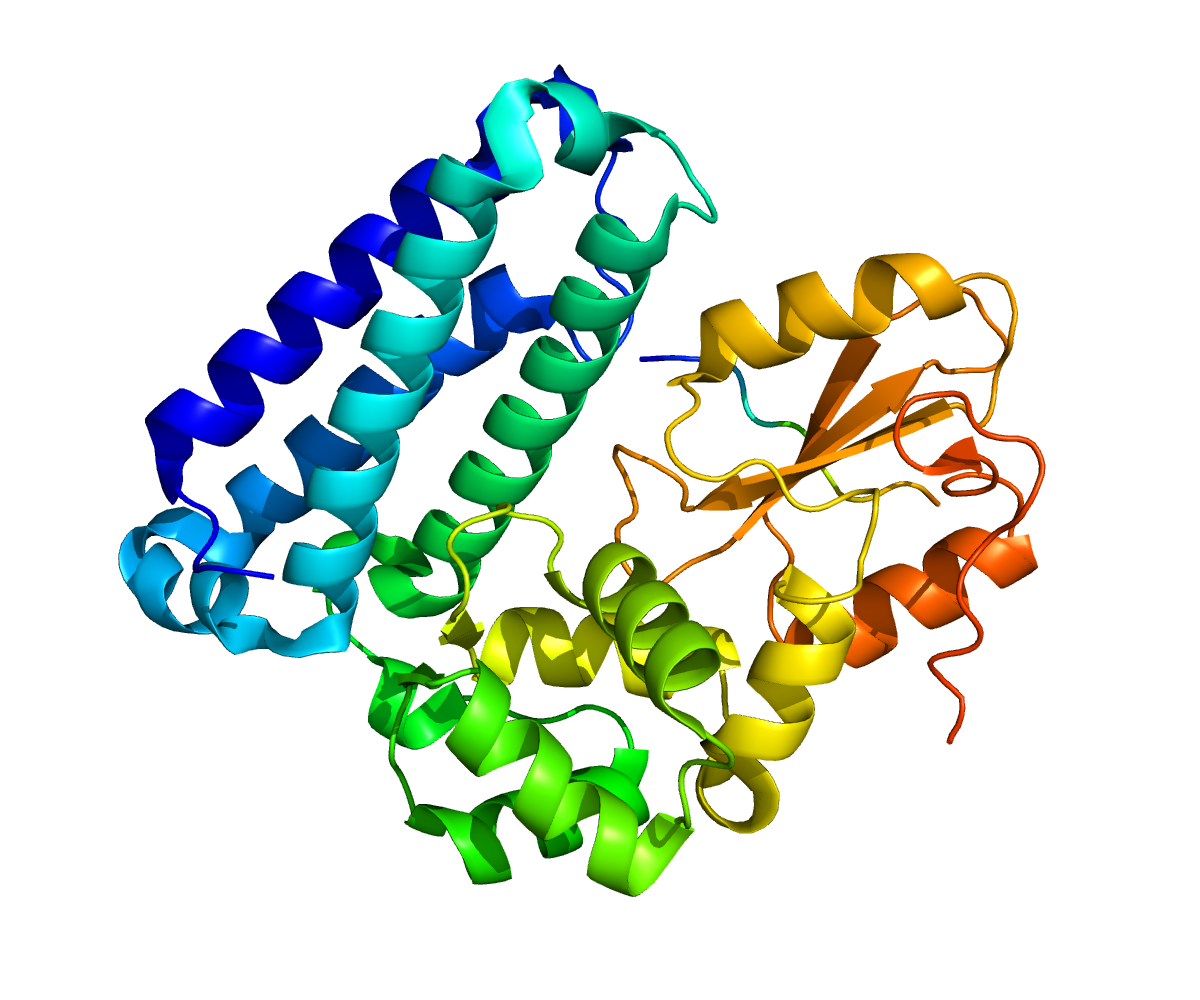
Available structures
PDB	Ortholog search: PDBe RCSB
PDB	List of PDB id codes 3BUM, 3OB1

Identifiers
- Aliases: SPRY2, hIGAN3, sprouty RTK signaling antagonist 2
- External IDs: OMIM: 602466; MGI: 1345138; HomoloGene: 4267; GeneCards: SPRY2; OMA:SPRY2 - orthologs

Gene location (Human)
Chr.	Chromosome 13 (human)
Band	13q31.1	Start	80,335,976 bp
Band	13q31.1	End	80,341,126 bp

Gene location (Mouse)
Chr.	Chromosome 14 (mouse)
Band	14 E2.3|14 56.16 cM	Start	106,129,381 bp
Band	14 E2.3|14 56.16 cM	End	106,134,253 bp
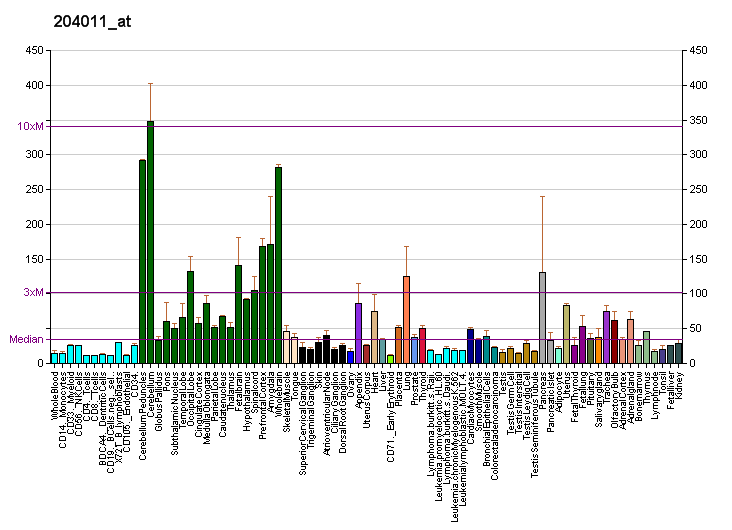
RNA expression pattern
Bgee	Human / Mouse (ortholog); Top expressed in: cartilage tissue; tibial nerve; right hemisphere of cerebellum; left uterine tube; ventricular zone; pericardium; parotid gland; right lung; right ventricle; retinal pigment epithelium / Top expressed in: primary motor cortex; blastocyst; morula; cingulate gyrus; deep cerebellar nuclei; lateral geniculate nucleus; retinal pigment epithelium; olfactory tubercle; epiblast; embryo; More reference expression data
BioGPS	More reference expression data
Gene ontology
Molecular function	protein serine/threonine kinase inhibitor activity; protein serine/threonine kinase activator activity; protein binding; protein kinase binding
Cellular component	cytoplasm; cytosol; cell projection; membrane; plasma membrane; ruffle membrane; microtubule; cytoskeleton; nucleus; microtubule cytoskeleton
Biological process	cell fate commitment; negative regulation of neurotrophin TRK receptor signaling pathway; positive regulation of protein kinase B signaling; negative regulation of epidermal growth factor receptor signaling pathway; lung morphogenesis; lung development; bud elongation involved in lung branching; negative regulation of peptidyl-threonine phosphorylation; lung growth; negative regulation of apoptotic process; hearing; positive regulation of peptidyl-serine phosphorylation; negative regulation of Ras protein signal transduction; multicellular organism development; negative regulation of fibroblast growth factor receptor signaling pathway; positive regulation of gene expression; negative regulation of GTPase activity; regulation of cell population proliferation; regulation of signal transduction; negative regulation of MAP kinase activity; inner ear morphogenesis; respiratory system development; establishment of mitotic spindle orientation; negative regulation of cell projection organization; positive regulation of ERK1 and ERK2 cascade; regulation of cell differentiation; branching morphogenesis of an epithelial tube; negative regulation of cell population proliferation; positive regulation of protein serine/threonine kinase activity; positive regulation of cell migration; negative regulation of ERK1 and ERK2 cascade; cellular response to leukemia inhibitory factor; negative regulation of angiogenesis; cellular response to vascular endothelial growth factor stimulus; negative regulation of vascular endothelial growth factor signaling pathway
Sources:Amigo / QuickGO
Orthologs
Species	Human	Mouse
Entrez	10253	24064
Ensembl	ENSG00000136158	ENSMUSG00000022114
UniProt	O43597	Q9QXV8
RefSeq (mRNA)	NM_005842; NM_001318536; NM_001318537; NM_001318538	NM_011897
RefSeq (protein)	NP_001305465; NP_001305466; NP_001305467; NP_005833	NP_036027
Location (UCSC)	Chr 13: 80.34 – 80.34 Mb	Chr 14: 106.13 – 106.13 Mb
PubMed search
- Wikidata
View/Edit Human	View/Edit Mouse

Sprouty homolog 2 (Drosophila), also known as SPRY2, is a protein which in humans is encoded by the SPRY2 gene.

== Function ==
This gene encodes a protein belonging to the sprouty family. The encoded protein contains a carboxyl-terminal cysteine-rich domain essential for the inhibitory activity on receptor tyrosine kinase signaling proteins and is required for growth factor stimulated translocation of the protein to membrane ruffles. In primary dermal endothelial cells this gene is transiently upregulated in response to fibroblast growth factor two. This protein is indirectly involved in the non-cell autonomous inhibitory effect on fibroblast growth factor two signaling. The protein interacts with Cas-Br-M (murine) ectropic retroviral transforming sequence, and can function as a bimodal regulator of epidermal growth factor receptor/mitogen-activated protein kinase signaling. This protein may play a role in alveoli branching during lung development as shown by a similar mouse protein.

SPRY2 is a negative feedback regulator of multiple receptor tyrosine kinases (RTKs) including receptors for fibroblast growth factor (FGF), epidermal growth factor (EGF), and hepatocyte growth factor (HGF). Antagonization of growth factor mediated pathways, cell migration, and cellular differentiation occurs through the ERK pathway. Spry2 can also enhance EGFR signaling by sequestering CBL. Spry gene expression has been reported silenced or repressed in cancer of the breast, liver, lung, prostate, and in lymphoma. Human spry2 expression is localized to the microtubules in unstimulated cells. All sprouty isoforms inhibit the ERK pathway by themselves, but can also form heterodimers and homodimers which have enhanced inhibition.

== Interactions ==
SPRY2 has been shown to interact with Cbl gene.

== See also ==
- SPRED1 gene
- Neurofibromin 1
- SPRY1
