= SPRED2 =

Protein-coding gene in the species Homo sapiens

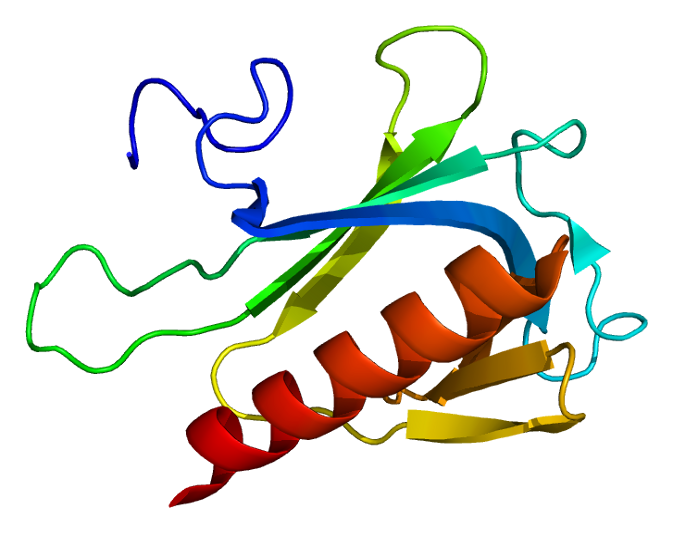
Available structures
PDB	Ortholog search: PDBe RCSB
PDB	List of PDB id codes 2JP2

Identifiers
- Aliases: SPRED2, Spred-2, sprouty related EVH1 domain containing 2, NS14
- External IDs: OMIM: 609292; MGI: 2150019; HomoloGene: 24918; GeneCards: SPRED2; OMA:SPRED2 - orthologs

Gene location (Human)
Chr.	Chromosome 2 (human)
Band	2p14	Start	65,310,851 bp
Band	2p14	End	65,432,637 bp

Gene location (Mouse)
Chr.	Chromosome 11 (mouse)
Band	11|11 A3.1	Start	19,874,375 bp
Band	11|11 A3.1	End	19,974,026 bp
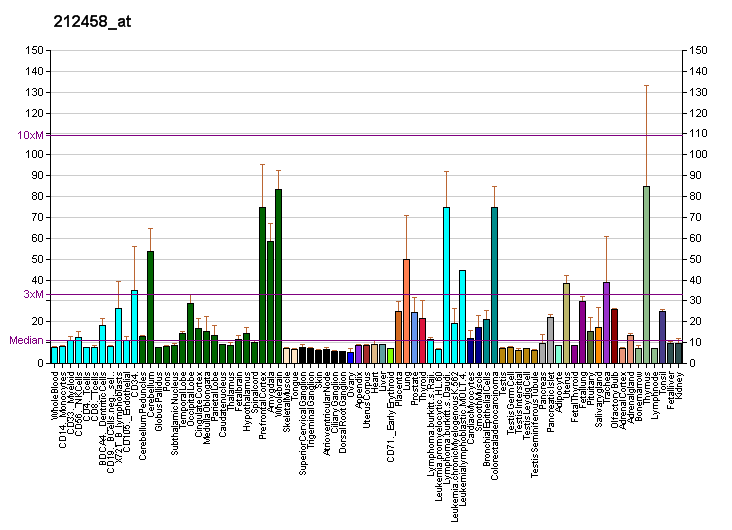

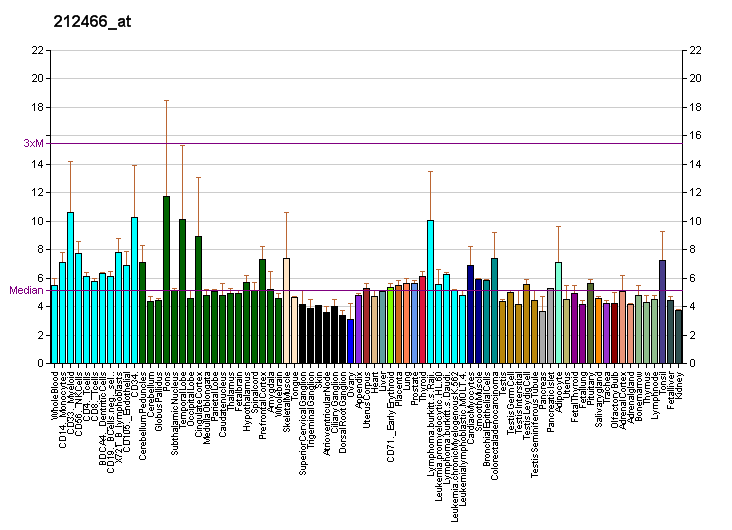
RNA expression pattern
Bgee	Human / Mouse (ortholog); Top expressed in: sural nerve; mucosa of sigmoid colon; ventricular zone; cartilage tissue; epithelium of colon; gonad; postcentral gyrus; prefrontal cortex; superior frontal gyrus; Brodmann area 46 / Top expressed in: tail of embryo; primitive streak; prefrontal cortex; cingulate gyrus; genital tubercle; hair follicle; primary motor cortex; hippocampus proper; cerebellar vermis; lobe of cerebellum; More reference expression data
BioGPS	More reference expression data
Gene ontology
Molecular function	protein binding; protein kinase binding; protein serine/threonine kinase inhibitor activity; stem cell factor receptor binding
Cellular component	cytoplasm; plasma membrane; transport vesicle membrane; membrane; cytoplasmic vesicle; cytosol
Biological process	multicellular organism development; negative regulation of peptidyl-threonine phosphorylation; regulation of signal transduction; fibroblast growth factor receptor signaling pathway; regulation of protein deacetylation; positive regulation of DNA damage response, signal transduction by p53 class mediator
Sources:Amigo / QuickGO
Orthologs
Species	Human	Mouse
Entrez	200734	114716
Ensembl	ENSG00000198369	ENSMUSG00000045671
UniProt	Q7Z698	Q924S7
RefSeq (mRNA)	NM_001128210; NM_181784	NM_033523
RefSeq (protein)	NP_001121682; NP_861449	NP_277058
Location (UCSC)	Chr 2: 65.31 – 65.43 Mb	Chr 11: 19.87 – 19.97 Mb
PubMed search
- Wikidata
View/Edit Human	View/Edit Mouse

Sprouty-related, EVH1 domain-containing protein 2 is a protein that in humans is encoded by the SPRED2 gene.

== Function ==
SPRED2 is a member of the Sprouty (see SPRY1)/SPRED family of proteins that regulate growth factor-induced activation of the MAP kinase cascade (see MAPK1).
