= SPRED3 =

Protein-coding gene in the species Homo sapiens

Identifiers
- Aliases: SPRED3, Eve-3, spred-3, sprouty related EVH1 domain containing 3
- External IDs: OMIM: 609293; MGI: 2142186; HomoloGene: 28061; GeneCards: SPRED3; OMA:SPRED3 - orthologs

Gene location (Human)
Chr.	Chromosome 19 (human)
Band	19q13.2	Start	38,388,421 bp
Band	19q13.2	End	38,399,587 bp

Gene location (Mouse)
Chr.	Chromosome 7 (mouse)
Band	7|7 B1	Start	28,858,254 bp
Band	7|7 B1	End	28,869,836 bp
RNA expression pattern
Bgee	Human / Mouse (ortholog); Top expressed in: parotid gland; lateral nuclear group of thalamus; vena cava; external globus pallidus; right ventricle; pars reticulata; Skeletal muscle tissue of rectus abdominis; body of tongue; pons; subthalamic nucleus / Top expressed in: visual cortex; primary visual cortex; superior frontal gyrus; tail of embryo; spermatid; neural layer of retina; dentate gyrus of hippocampal formation granule cell; lumbar subsegment of spinal cord; ventricular zone; genital tubercle; More reference expression data
BioGPS	n/a
Gene ontology
Molecular function	protein kinase binding
Cellular component	membrane
Biological process	multicellular organism development; regulation of signal transduction; negative regulation of peptidyl-threonine phosphorylation; positive regulation of DNA damage response, signal transduction by p53 class mediator; regulation of protein deacetylation
Sources:Amigo / QuickGO
Orthologs
Species	Human	Mouse
Entrez	399473	101809
Ensembl	ENSG00000188766	ENSMUSG00000037239
UniProt	Q2MJR0	Q6P6N5
RefSeq (mRNA)	NM_001039616; NM_001042522; NM_001394336; NM_001394337; NM_001394338	NM_182927
RefSeq (protein)	NP_001035987	NP_891557
Location (UCSC)	Chr 19: 38.39 – 38.4 Mb	Chr 7: 28.86 – 28.87 Mb
PubMed search
- Wikidata
View/Edit Human	View/Edit Mouse

Sprouty-related, EVH1 domain-containing protein 3 also known as Spread-3 is a protein that in humans is encoded by the SPRED3 gene.

Spread-3 is a member of the Sprouty (see SPRY1/SPRED) family of proteins that regulate growth factor-induced activation of the MAP kinase cascade.
