= Legius syndrome =

- Other names: Neurofibromatosis 1-like syndrome
- This condition is inherited in an autosomal dominant manner.
- Symptoms: café au lait spots; +/- learning disabilities
- Usual onset: at birth
- Causes: Mutations in the SPRED1 gene
- Diagnostic method: Clinical findings, Genetic test
- Differential diagnosis: neurofibromatosis type I
- Treatment: Physical therapy, Speech therapy
- Prognosis: good
- Frequency: rare (estimated at 1:46,000-1:75,000)

Legius syndrome (LS) is an autosomal dominant condition characterized by cafe au lait spots. It was first described in 2007 and is often mistaken for neurofibromatosis type I. It is caused by mutations in the SPRED1 gene. It is also known as neurofibromatosis type 1-like syndrome.

== Symptoms and signs ==
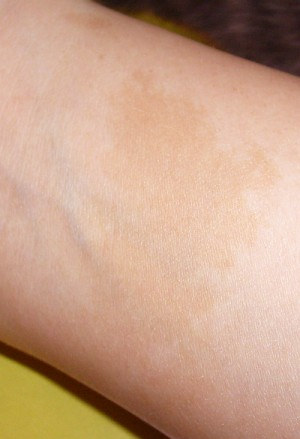
larger café au lait spot on right forearm

Nearly all individuals with Legius syndrome show multiple café au lait spots on their skin. Symptoms may include:

- Freckles in the axillary and inguinal skin fold
- Lipomas, developing in adulthood
- Macrocephaly
- Learning disabilities
- Attention deficit hyperactivity disorder
- Developmental delay

Features common in neurofibromatosis – like Lisch nodules (iris hamartomas diagnosed on slit lamp exam), bone abnormalities, neurofibromas, optic pathway gliomas and malignant peripheral nerve sheath tumors – are absent in Legius syndrome.

== Cause ==
CHR 15

Legius syndrome is a phakomatosis and a RASopathy, a developmental syndrome due to germline mutations in genes. The condition is autosomal dominant in regards to inheritance and caused by mutations to the SPRED1 gene at chromosome 15, specifically 15q14 (or (GRCh38): 15:38,252,086-38,357,248). The gene in question demonstrates almost 100 mutations.

== Mechanism ==
A mutated SPRED1 protein adversely regulates Ras-MAPK signaling, which is a chain of proteins in a cell that sends signals from the surface of a cell to the nucleus which in turn causes the symptoms of this condition.

== Diagnosis ==
Genetic testing is necessary to identify the syndrome. The DNA test is necessary sometimes, because symptoms may not be sufficient to definitely diagnose this condition.

=== Differential diagnosis ===
The symptoms of Legius syndrome and neurofibromatosis type I are very similar; An important difference between Legius syndrome and neurofibromatosis type I is the absence of tumor growths Lisch nodules and neurofibromas which are common in neurofibromatosis type I.

A genetic test is often the only way to make sure a person has Legius syndrome and not neurofibromatosis type I; the similarity of symptoms stem from the fact that the different genes affected in the two syndromes code for proteins that carry out a similar task in the same reaction pathway.

== Treatment ==
Management of Legius syndrome is done via the following:

- Physical therapy
- Speech therapy
- Pharmacologic therapy (e.g. methylphenidate for attention deficit hyperactivity disorder)

The prognosis of this condition is generally considered good with appropriate treatment.

== See also ==
- List of cutaneous conditions
- List of genes mutated in cutaneous conditions
