= Café au lait spot =

Type of birthmark caused by a collection of melanocytes

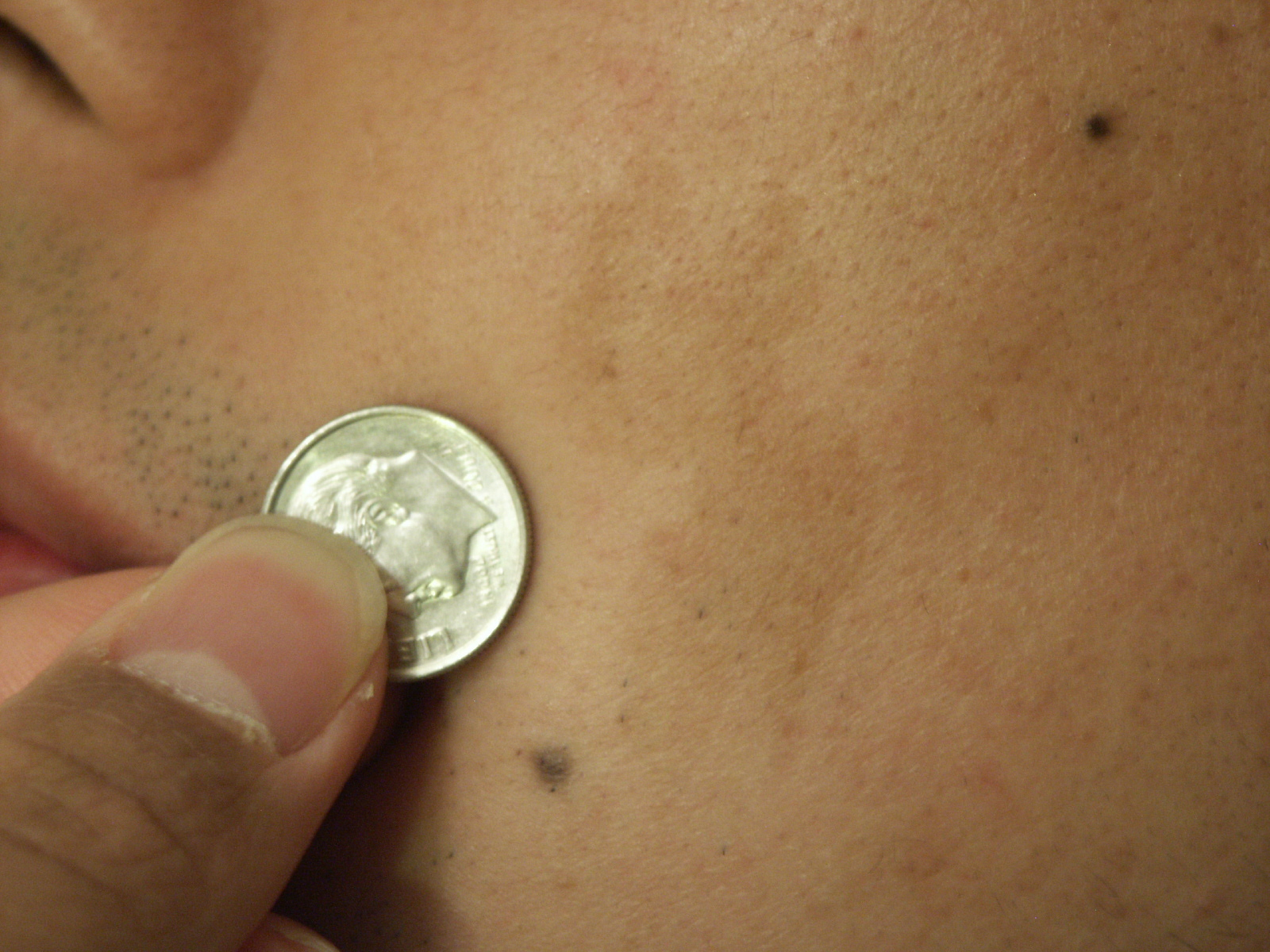
- A café au lait spot on a patient's left cheek
- Specialty: Dermatology

Café au lait spots, or café au lait macules, are flat, hyperpigmented birthmarks. The name café au lait is French for "coffee with milk" and refers to their light-brown color. They are caused by a collection of pigment-producing melanocytes in the epidermis of the skin. These spots are typically permanent and may grow or increase in number over time.

Café au lait spots are often harmless but may be associated with syndromes such as neurofibromatosis type 1 and McCune–Albright syndrome. Café au lait lesions with rough borders ("coast of Maine") may be seen in McCune–Albright syndrome. In contrast, café au lait lesions of neurofibromatosis type 1 have smooth borders ("coast of California").

== Cause ==
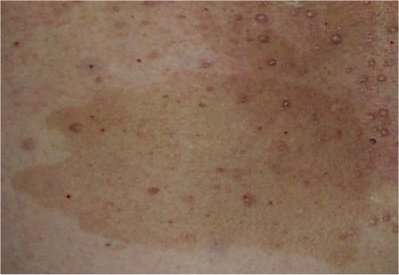
Neurofibromatosis type I café au lait spot

Café au lait spots can arise from diverse and unrelated causes:

- Ataxia–telangiectasia
- Basal cell nevus syndrome
- Benign congenital skin lesion
- Bloom syndrome
- Chédiak–Higashi syndrome
- Congenital melanocytic naevus
- Fanconi anemia
- Fibrous dysplasia of bone
- Gaucher disease
- Hunter syndrome
- Jaffe–Campanacci syndrome
- Legius syndrome
- Maffucci syndrome
- They can be caused by vitiligo in the rare McCune–Albright syndrome.
- Multiple mucosal neuroma syndrome
- Having six or more café au lait spots greater than 5 mm in diameter before puberty, or greater than 15 mm in diameter after puberty, is a diagnostic feature of neurofibromatosis type I (NF-1), but other features are required to diagnose NF-1. Familial multiple cafe-au-lait spots have been observed without an NF-1 diagnosis.
- Noonan syndrome
- Silver–Russell syndrome
- Tuberous sclerosis
- Watson syndrome
- Wiskott–Aldrich syndrome

== Diagnosis ==
Diagnosis is visual with measurement of spot size. The number of spots can have clinical significance for diagnosis of associated disorders such as neurofibromatosis type I. Six or more spots of at least 5 mm in diameter in pre-pubertal children and at least 15 mm in post-pubertal individuals is one of the major diagnostic criteria for NF1.

== Prognosis ==
Café au lait spots are usually present at birth, permanent, and may grow in size or increase in number over time.

Café au lait spots are themselves benign and do not cause any illness or problems. However, they may be associated with syndromes such as neurofibromatosis type 1 and McCune–Albright syndrome.

The size and shape of the spots can vary in terms of description. In neurofibromatosis type 1, the spots tend to be described as ovoid, with smooth borders. In other disorders, the spots can be less ovoid, with jagged borders. In neurofibromatosis type 1, the spots tend to resemble the "coast of California" rather than the "coast of Maine", meaning the edges are smoother and more linear.

== Treatment ==
Café au lait spots can be removed with lasers. Results are variable as the spots are often not completely removed or can come back after treatment. Often, a test spot is treated first to help predict the likelihood of treatment success.

== See also ==
- Birthmark
- Nevus
- List of cutaneous conditions
- List of conditions associated with café au lait macules
