= Lisch nodule =

Small growths on the iris of the eye

- Other names: Iris hamartoma
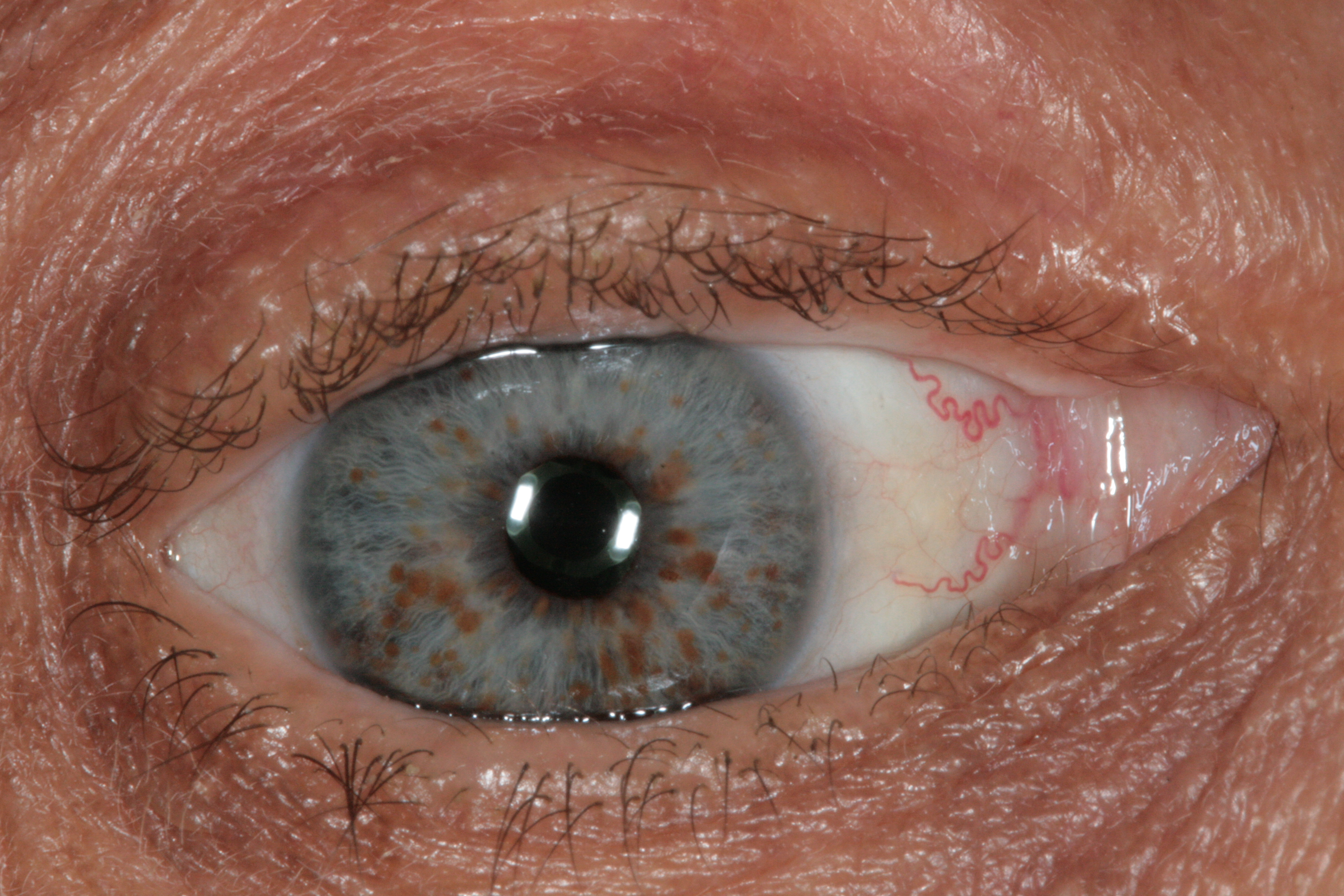
- Lisch nodules on surface of iris

Lisch nodule, also known as iris hamartoma, is a pigmented hamartomatous nodular aggregate of dendritic melanocytes affecting the iris, named after Austrian ophthalmologist Karl Lisch (1907–1999), who first recognized them in 1937.

The first published use of the term Lisch nodule was in the New England Journal of Medicine "Medical Progress" series article of December 31, 1981 (Riccardi VM: Von Recklinghausen Neurofibromatosis. N Engl J Med 1981;305:1617–27).

These nodules are found in neurofibromatosis type 1, and are present in greater than 94% of patients over the age of six. They are clear, yellow-brown, oval to round, dome-shaped papules that project from the surface of the iris. These nodules typically do not affect vision, but are very useful in diagnosis. They are detected by slit lamp examination. Immunohistochemistry stains positive against the proteins vimentin and S-100, and points to an ectodermal origin for the nodules. Their precise origin and structure, however, are still under investigation. They can rarely be seen in neurofibromatosis type 2.

== See also ==
- Glaucoma
- Watson syndrome
