= Neurofibromatosis type II =

Type of neurofibromatosis disease

- Other names: multiple inherited schwannomas, meningiomas, and ependymomas (MISME syndrome))
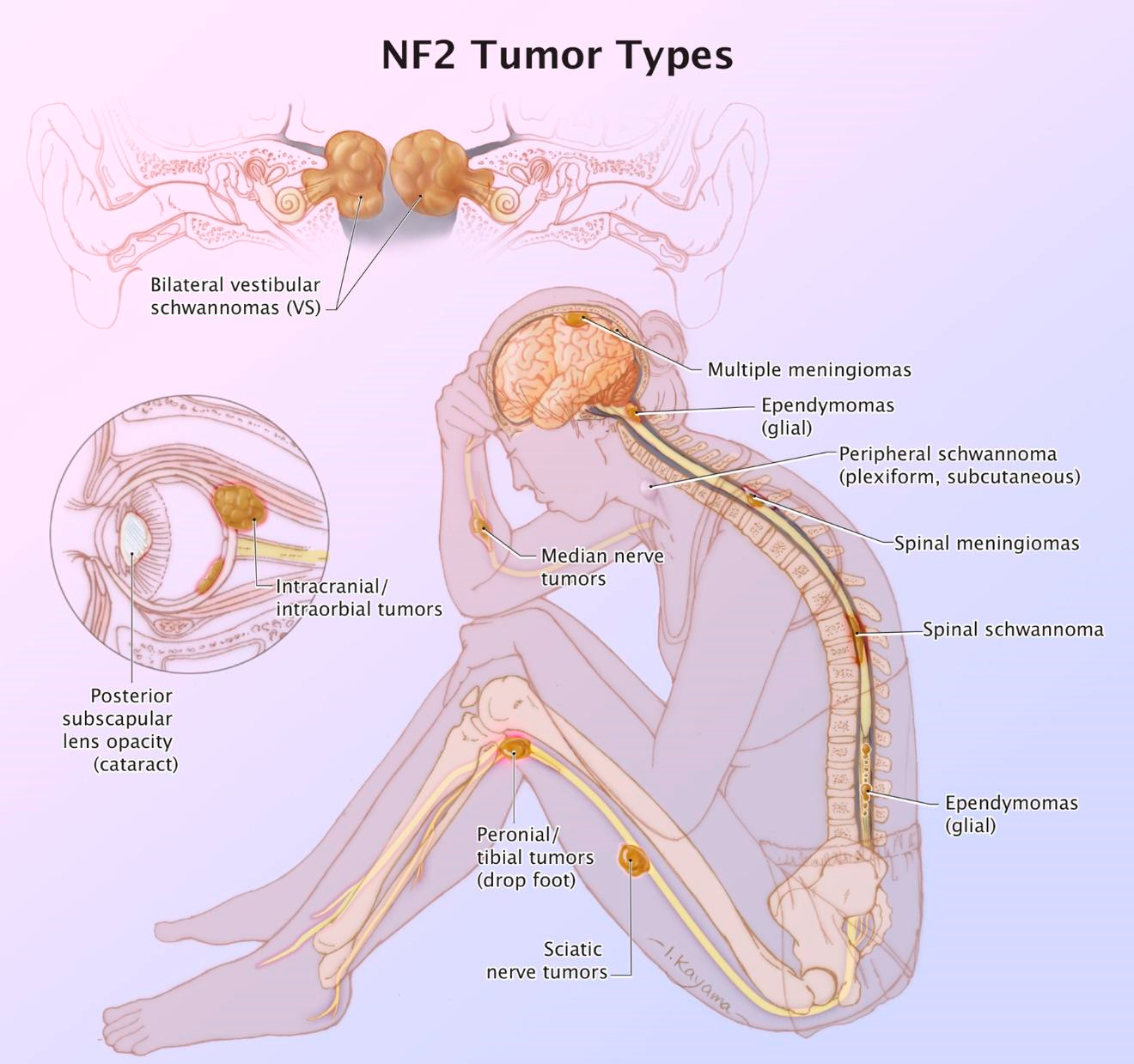
- Figure of various morbidities associated with neurofibromatosis type II
- Specialty: Medical genetics, neurology
- Frequency: 0.0017806%

Neurofibromatosis type II (NF2 or NF II; also known as MISME syndrome – multiple inherited schwannomas, meningiomas, and ependymomas) is a genetic condition that may be inherited or may arise spontaneously, and causes benign tumors of the brain, spinal cord, and peripheral nerves. The types of tumors frequently associated with NF2 include vestibular schwannomas, meningiomas, and ependymomas. The main manifestation of the condition is the development of bilateral benign brain tumors in the nerve sheath of the cranial nerve VIII, which is the "auditory-vestibular nerve" that transmits sensory information from the inner ear to the brain. Besides, other benign brain and spinal tumors occur. Symptoms depend on the presence, localisation and growth of the tumor(s). Many people with this condition also experience vision problems.

NF2 is caused by mutations of the "Merlin" gene, which seems to influence the form and movement of cells. The principal treatments consist of neurosurgical removal of the tumors and surgical treatment of the eye lesions. Historically, the underlying disorder has not had any therapy due to the cell function caused by the genetic mutation.

== Classification ==
NF2 is an inheritable disorder with an autosomal dominant mode of transmission.

There are two forms of the NF2:

- The Wishart-phenotype form is characterized by multiple cerebral and spinal lesions in people younger than 20 years and with rapid progression of the tumours.
- People with NF2 who develop single central tumours with slow progression after the age of 20 are thought to have the Feiling–Gardner phenotype.

== Symptoms and signs ==
Symptoms can occur at any age, typically in adolescence and early adulthood, and rarely seen in children, and the severity depends on the location of the tumours. Symptoms include, but are not limited to:

- Tinnitus
- Loss/problems of balance
- Glaucoma
- Seizures
- Hearing loss
- Vision impairment
- Numbness or weakness in arms and legs

=== Hearing loss ===
Because hearing loss in those with NF2 almost always occurs after acquisition of verbal language skills, people with NF2 do not always integrate well into Deaf culture and are more likely to resort to auditory assistive technology. One of these devices is the cochlear implant, which can sometimes restore a high level of auditory function even when natural hearing is totally lost. However, the amount of destruction to the cochlear nerve caused by the typical NF2 schwannoma often precludes the use of such an implant. In these cases, an auditory brainstem implant (ABI) can restore some level of hearing, supplemented by lip reading.

== Cause ==
NF-2 may be inherited in an autosomal dominant fashion, as well as through random mutation.

NF2 is caused by inactivating mutations in the NF2 gene located at 22q12.2 of chromosome 22, type of mutations vary and include protein-truncating alterations (frameshift deletions/insertions and nonsense mutations), splice-site mutations, missense mutations and others. Deletions, too, in the NH_{2}-terminal domain of merlin proteins have been associated with early tumor onset and poor prognosis in people with NF2. Protein truncating mutations correlate with more severe phenotype. There is a broad clinical spectrum known, but all people with the condition who have been checked have been found to have some mutation of the same gene on chromosome 22. Through statistics, it is suspected that one-half of cases are inherited, and one-half are the result of new, de novo mutations.

== Pathogenesis ==
NF2 is caused by a defect in the gene that normally gives rise to a product called Merlin or Schwannomin, located on chromosome 22 band q11-13.1. Merlin was first discovered as a structural protein functioning as an actin cytoskeleton regulator. Later merlin's tumour suppressant role was described. Merlin regulates multiple proliferative signalling cascades such as receptor tyrosine kinase signalling, p21-activated kinase signalling, Ras signalling, MEK-ERK cascade, MST-YAP cascade. In a normal cell, the concentrations of active (dephosphorylated) merlin are controlled by processes such as cell adhesion (which would indicate the need to restrain cell division). It has been shown that Merlin inhibits Rac1 which is crucial for cell motility and tumour invasion. Also, merlin's interaction with cyclin D was described. It is known that Merlin's deficiency can result in unmediated progression through the cell cycle due to the lack of contact-mediated tumour suppression, mainly because of the cell:cell junction disruption, sufficient to result in the tumors characteristic of Neurofibromatosis type II. Recent studies showed that besides its cytoskeletal and cytoplasmic functions Merlin also translocates to the nucleus and suppresses proliferation by inhibiting E3 ubiquitin ligase CRL4(DCAF1). Finally, most recent studies indicated that Merlin also plays important role in energy metabolism regulation. Mutations of NF2 is presumed to result in either a failure to synthesize Merlin or the production of a defective peptide that lacks the normal tumor-suppressive effect. The Schwannomin-peptide consists of 595 amino acids. Comparison of Schwannomin with other proteins shows similarities to proteins that connect the cytoskeleton to the cell membrane. Mutations in the Schwannomin-gene are thought to alter the movement and shape of affected cells with loss of contact inhibition. Ependymomas are tumors arising from the ependyma, an epithelium-like tissue of the central nervous system. In people with NF2 and ependymomas, the tumor suppressant function of Merlin may be compromised. Loss of function mutations occurring in chromosome 22q, where Merlin proteins are coded, can promote tumorigenesis, or the creation of new tumorous cells. Deletions, too, in the NH_{2}-terminal domain of merlin proteins have been associated with early tumor onset and poor prognosis in affected people.

=== Pathology ===
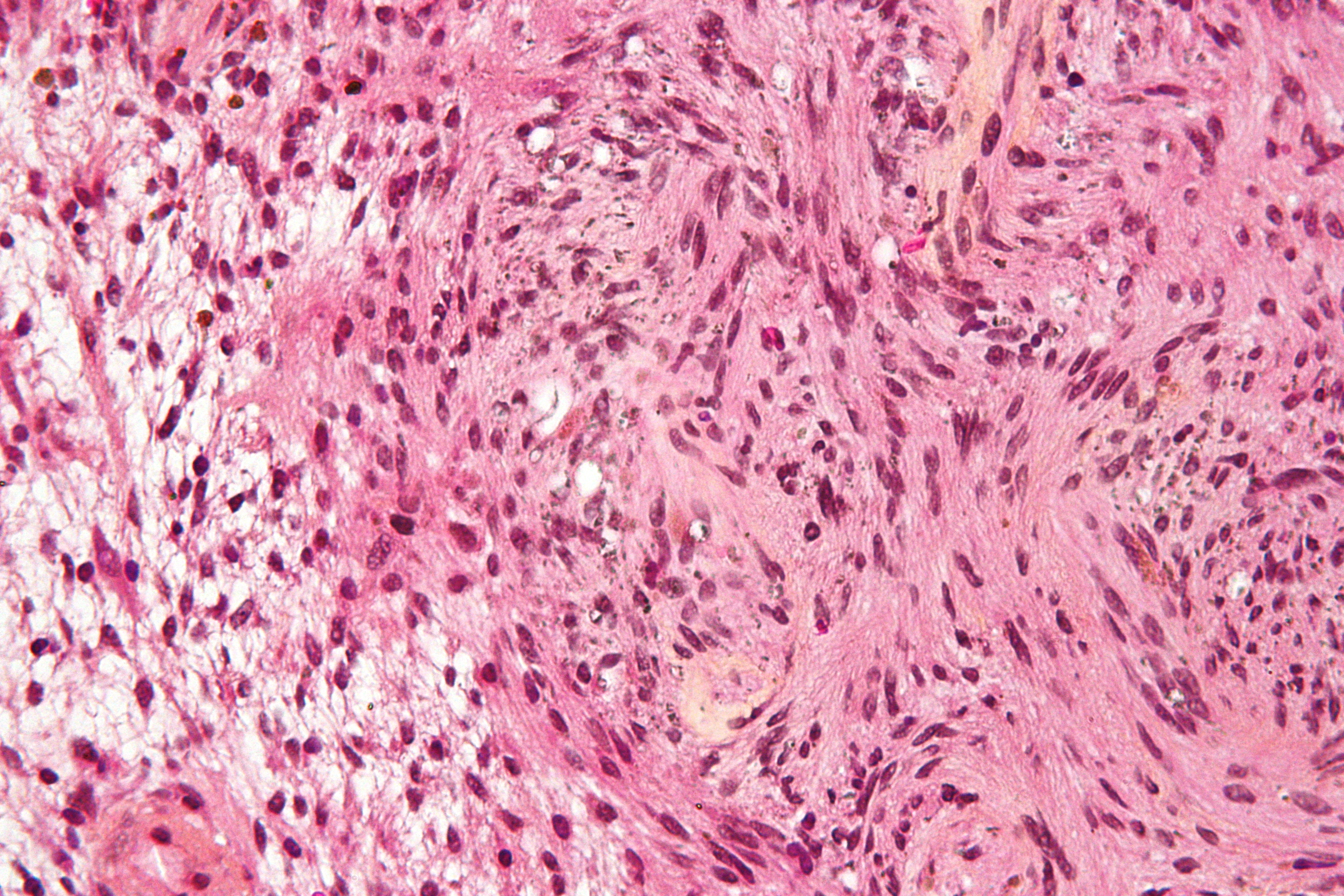
Micrograph of a schwannoma, a tumor seen in neurofibromatosis type II. HPS stain.

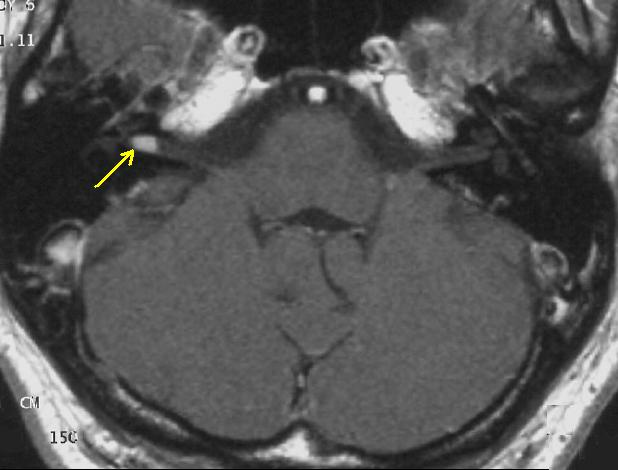
Schwannoma of the N. Vestibularis

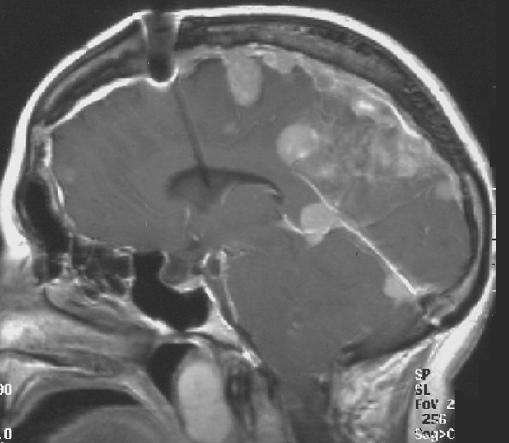
Meningiomas in a person with NFII

The so-called acoustic neuroma of NF2 is in fact a schwannoma of the nervus vestibularis, or vestibular schwannoma. The misnomer of acoustic neuroma is still often used. The vestibular schwannomas grow slowly at the inner entrance of the internal auditory meatus (meatus acousticus internus). They derive from the nerve sheaths of the upper part of the nervus vestibularis in the region between the central and peripheral myelin (Obersteiner-Redlich-Zone) within the area of the porus acousticus, 1 cm from the brainstem.

=== Genotype–phenotype correlation ===
Many people with NF2 were included in studies that were designed to compare disease type and progression with exact determination of the associated mutation. The goal of such comparisons of genotype and phenotype is to determine whether specific mutations cause respective combinations of symptoms. This would be extremely valuable for the prediction of disease progression and the planning of therapy starting at a young age. The results of such studies are the following:

- In most cases the mutation in the NF2 gene causes shortened peptides.
- There are no mutational hot spots.
- People with frameshift mutations or nonsense mutations have poor prognosis.
- People with missense mutations have a better prognosis.
- In cases with mutations in the splice-acceptor-region, there is no good correlation to determine.
- Point mutations may have only minor effects.
- Cases are published in which exactly the same mutation is associated with clearly different outcomes.

These results suggest that other factors (environment, other mutations) will probably determine the clinical outcome.

== Diagnosis ==
NF-2 Locus

NF2 is a genetically transmitted condition. Diagnosis is most common in early adulthood (20–30 years); however, it can be diagnosed earlier. NF2 can be diagnosed due to the presence of a bilateral vestibular schwannoma, or an acoustic neuroma, which causes a hearing loss that may begin unilaterally. If a patient does not meet this criterion of diagnosis, they must have a family history of NF2, and present with a unilateral vestibular schwannoma and other associated tumors (cranial meningioma, cranial nerve schwannoma, spinal meningioma, spinal ependymomas, peripheral nerve tumor, spinal schwannoma, subcutaneous tumor, skin plaque). This being said, more than half of all patients diagnosed with NF2 do not have a family history of the condition. Although it has yet to be included into clinical classification, peripheral neuropathy, or damage to the peripheral nerves, which often causes weakness, numbness and pain in the hands and feet, may also lead to a diagnosis of NF2. In children, NF2 can present with similar symptoms, but generally causes "visual disturbances (cataracts, hamartomas), skin tumors, mononeuropathhy (facial paresis, drop foot), symptomatic spinal cord tumors, or non-vestibular intracranial tumors".

=== Prenatal ===
Bilateral vestibular schwannomas are diagnostic of NF2.

=== Postnatal ===
Ferner et al. give three sets of diagnostic criteria for NF2:

1. Bilateral vestibular schwannoma (VS) or family history of NF2 plus Unilateral VS or any two of: meningioma, glioma, neurofibroma, schwannoma, posterior subcapsular lenticular opacities
2. Unilateral VS plus any two of meningioma, glioma, neurofibroma, schwannoma, posterior subcapsular lenticular opacities
3. Two or more meningioma plus unilateral VS or any two of glioma, schwannoma and cataract.

Another set of diagnostic criteria is the following:

- Detection of bilateral acoustic neuroma by imaging-procedures
- First degree relative with NF2 and the occurrence of neurofibroma, meningiomas, glioma, or Schwannoma
- First degree relative with NF2 and the occurrence of juvenile posterior subcapsular cataract.

The criteria have varied over time. The last revision of the NF2 criteria was done by M.J. Smith in 2017. This included the consideration of a LZTR1 mutation (schwannomatosis) instead of NF2 and excluded bilateral vestibular schwannomas that occur after 70 years of age.

== Treatment ==
=== Surgery ===
There are several different surgical techniques for the removal of acoustic neuroma. The choice of approach is determined by size of the tumour, hearing capability, and general clinical condition of the person.

- The retrosigmoid approach offers some opportunity for the retention of hearing.
- The translabyrinthine approach will sacrifice hearing on that side, but will usually spare the facial nerve. Post-operative cerebrospinal fluid leaks are more common.
- The middle fossa approach is preferred for small tumors and offers the highest probability of retention of hearing and vestibular function.
- Less invasive endoscopic techniques have been done outside of the United States for some time. Recovery times are reported to be faster. However, this technique is not yet mainstream among surgeons in the US.

Larger tumors can be treated by either the translabyrinthine approach or the retrosigmoid approach, depending upon the experience of the surgical team. With large tumors, the chance of hearing preservation is small with any approach. When hearing is already poor, the translabyrinthine approach may be used for even small tumors. Small, lateralized tumours in people with NF2 with good hearing should have the middle fossa approach. When the location of the tumour is more medial a retrosigmoid approach may be better.

Auditory canal decompression is another surgical technique that can prolong usable hearing when a vestibular schwannoma has grown too large to remove without damage to the cochlear nerve. In the IAC (internal auditory canal) decompression, a middle fossa approach is employed to expose the bony roof of the IAC without any attempt to remove the tumor. The bone overlying the acoustic nerve is removed, allowing the tumour to expand upward into the middle cranial fossa. In this way, pressure on the cochlear nerve is relieved, reducing the risk of further hearing loss from direct compression or obstruction of vascular supply to the nerve.

Radiosurgery is a conservative alternative to cranial base or other intracranial surgery. With conformal radiosurgical techniques, therapeutic radiation focused on the tumour, sparing exposure to surrounding normal tissues. Although radiosurgery can seldom completely destroy a tumor, it can often arrest its growth or reduce its size. While radiation is less immediately damaging than conventional surgery, it incurs a higher risk of subsequent malignant change in the irradiated tissues, and this risk is higher in NF2 than in sporadic (non-NF2) lesions.

=== Medications ===
There are no prescription medicines currently indicated for reduction in tumor burden for NF2 patients, although in patient studies Bevacizumab has resulted in reduction in tumor growth rates and hearing improvements in some patients.

=== Treatment hearing loss ===
As hearing loss in individuals with NF2 is generally gradual, eventually profound and sensorineural, the best options for treatment for hearing loss are cochlear implants and auditory brainstem implants (ABIs), as well as supplementing hearing with lip-reading, cued speech or sign language.

==== Cochlear Implants ====
A cochlear implant is an electronic device that is surgically implants to stimulate the cochlear nerve. Cochlear implants will work only when the cochleovestibular nerve (8th nerve) and the cochlea are still functioning. In a study done with open-set speech perception testing and closed-set speech perception testing by Neff et al., they discovered that the use of cochlear implants with NF2 patients allowed significant improvement of hearing abilities. In testing of recognition of sentences of everyday speech, five out of six patients scored within the 90–100% range, and in testing of hearing in noise setting, four of six of the patients scored within the 83–96%. Additionally, all testing was done without lip-reading.

==== Auditory Brainstem Implants (ABIs) ====
Auditory Brainstem Implants, or ABIs, are used when the cochlea or any portion of the cochleovestibular nerve are not functioning due to damage to those areas or anatomic abnormalities. The procedure is done by implanting a device that send an electrical signal directly to the cochlear nucleus, allowing sound to bypass the peripheral auditory system and straight into the brain stem.

== Prognosis ==
NF2 is a life limiting condition. It is a rare genetic disorder that involves noncancerous tumors of the nerves that transmit balance and sound impulses from the inner ear to the brain. The prognosis is affected by early age onset, a higher number of meningiomas and schwannomas and having a decrease in mutation.

An early diagnosis is the best way to ensure improvement in management. Although, even with an early diagnosis, some patients still die very young.

Meningiomas and schwannomas occur in around half of patients with NF2. Meningiomas are tumors that are both intracranial and intraspinal. Schwannomas are tumors that are often centered on the internal auditory canal. Patients with NF2 who have meningiomas have a higher risk of mortality, and the treatment can be very challenging. Individuals who develop schwannomas frequently develop hearing loss and deafness. These individuals may also develop tinnitus after being presented with unilateral hearing loss. The first symptom that individuals may encounter is dizziness or imbalance.

Truncating mutations lead to smaller and non-functional protein products. Studies have shown that missense mutations and large deletions can both cause predominantly mild phenotypes. Phenotype is more variable in patients with splice-site mutations, and a milder disease in patients with mutations in exons 9–15. Patients with a missense mutation have a greater survival rate than nonsense and frameshift mutations.

== Prevalence ==
Incidence of the condition is about 1 in 60,000.
