= SPRY1 =

Protein-coding gene in the species Homo sapiens

Identifiers
- Aliases: SPRY1, hsprouty RTK signaling antagonist 1
- External IDs: OMIM: 602465; MGI: 1345139; HomoloGene: 4266; GeneCards: SPRY1; OMA:SPRY1 - orthologs

Gene location (Human)
Chr.	Chromosome 4 (human)
Band	4q28.1	Start	123,396,795 bp
Band	4q28.1	End	123,403,760 bp

Gene location (Mouse)
Chr.	Chromosome 3 (mouse)
Band	3|3 B	Start	37,694,096 bp
Band	3|3 B	End	37,698,747 bp
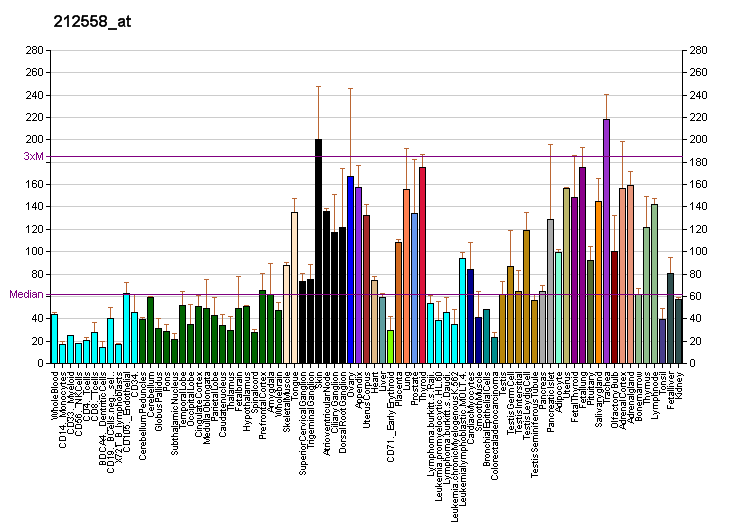
RNA expression pattern
Bgee	Human / Mouse (ortholog); Top expressed in: pericardium; vena cava; gallbladder; parietal pleura; epithelium of colon; subcutaneous adipose tissue; canal of the cervix; skin of leg; left uterine tube; left lobe of thyroid gland / Top expressed in: secondary oocyte; tail of embryo; lip; primary oocyte; lung; esophagus; quadriceps femoris muscle; right kidney; zone of skin; adrenal gland; More reference expression data
BioGPS	More reference expression data
Gene ontology
Molecular function	protein binding
Cellular component	Golgi apparatus; membrane; plasma membrane; nucleoplasm; cytoplasm; cytosol
Biological process	ureteric bud development; negative regulation of neurotrophin TRK receptor signaling pathway; negative regulation of epidermal growth factor receptor signaling pathway; organ induction; bud elongation involved in lung branching; negative regulation of Ras protein signal transduction; multicellular organism development; negative regulation of fibroblast growth factor receptor signaling pathway; negative regulation of GTPase activity; regulation of signal transduction; negative regulation of MAP kinase activity; establishment of mitotic spindle orientation; metanephros development; negative regulation of cell population proliferation; negative regulation of ERK1 and ERK2 cascade; epithelial to mesenchymal transition involved in cardiac fibroblast development
Sources:Amigo / QuickGO
Orthologs
Species	Human	Mouse
Entrez	10252	24063
Ensembl	ENSG00000164056	ENSMUSG00000037211
UniProt	O43609	Q9QXV9
RefSeq (mRNA)	NM_001258038; NM_001258039; NM_005841; NM_199327; NM_001375410	NM_011896; NM_001305440; NM_001305441; NM_001305442
RefSeq (protein)	NP_001244967; NP_001244968; NP_005832; NP_955359; NP_001362339	NP_001292369; NP_001292370; NP_001292371; NP_036026
Location (UCSC)	Chr 4: 123.4 – 123.4 Mb	Chr 3: 37.69 – 37.7 Mb
PubMed search
- Wikidata
View/Edit Human	View/Edit Mouse

Protein sprouty homolog 1 is a protein that in humans is encoded by the SPRY1 gene.

== See also ==
- Neurofibromin 1
- SPRED1
