= Congenital pseudarthrosis of the tibia =

Medical condition

Congenital pseudarthrosis of the tibia (CPT) is a rare paediatric disease presenting with a bowing deformity of the tibia at birth or within the first decade of life. It is most commonly associated with Neurofibromatosis type 1 (NF-1). For children with CPT, pathological fracture of the tibia eventually occurs, resulting in persistent nonunion of the fracture site. If left untreated, leg deformities, joint stiffness, leg-length discrepancy and pain will persist. Diagnosis is done clinically and through X-ray imaging, with numerous classifications based on the severity of bowing and presence of fracture or intraosseous lesion.

Pathogenesis of CPT remains unclear. Genetic factors may be related due to its association with NF-1, but does not completely explain the development and location of CPT. It is likely related to the involvement of pathological periosteum in the tibia, resulting in abnormal bone turnover.

Treatment for CPT is through surgical correction, to limit the progression of deformity and to correct shortening of the affected limb. Prognosis of treatment depends on site and type of CPT, and there is a risk of recurrent fracture.

About 1 in 150,000 births present with CPT, but aside from its association with NF-1, not much else is shown from epidemiological studies.

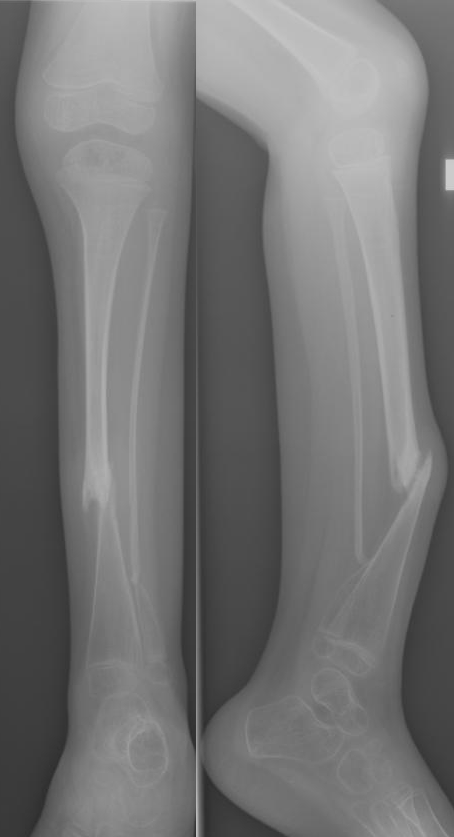
X-ray image of congenital pseudarthrosis of the tibia with anterior fracture

== Signs and symptoms ==
Primary CPT presents at birth or in infants as anterolateral bowing of the tibia. Bowing is observed as shortening of the corresponding leg, and is confirmed with X-ray imaging. It is commonly presented unilaterally, but can be bilateral.

Secondary CPT does not present with obvious bowing at birth and may be overlooked, but will eventually progress to pathological fracture as the infant grows. Approximately 50% of fractures occur before the patient is two years of age, when toddlers begin learning to walk.

CPT is characterized by persistent nonunion because of fractures of the tibia and the presence of fibrous tissue between parts of the fractured bone. The persistent nonunion eventually leads to the formation of a false joint, otherwise known as pseudarthrosis. This pseudarthrosis is a non-healing bone lesion, resulting in reduction of mobility and persistent pain in the lower leg.

=== Associated conditions ===
CPT is most commonly associated with NF-1, with around 50% of cases of CPT being developed from NF-1. A complete neurological and dermatological examination should be done for a newborn baby with anterolateral bowing of the tibia to screen for NF-1.

== Diagnosis ==
Diagnosis is done through clinical examination and confirmed with radiographs of the tibia. Other associated clinical findings for NF-1, such as cafe-au-lait spots, neurofibromas and lisch nodules may also be found. "Early onset" CPT is regarded as fracture occurring <4 years old, while "late onset" CPT is regarded as fracture occurring >4 years old. Numerous other classifications have been proposed for CPT, owing to the heterogeneity of the disease. The Crawford and Boyd classifications are more traditional descriptive classifications emphasizing the presence of sclerosis, cystic and atrophic changes of the tibia. The Paley classification is a more recent classification which also takes into account the fibula for treatment and outcome.

=== Staging ===
Crawford classification
Type	Findings
I	Anterior bowing with an increase in cortical density and a narrow medulla
II	Anterior bowing with narrow, sclerotic medulla
III	Anterior bowing associated with a cyst or signs of a prefracture
IV	Anterior bowing and a clear fracture with pseudarthrosis often associating the tibia and fibula

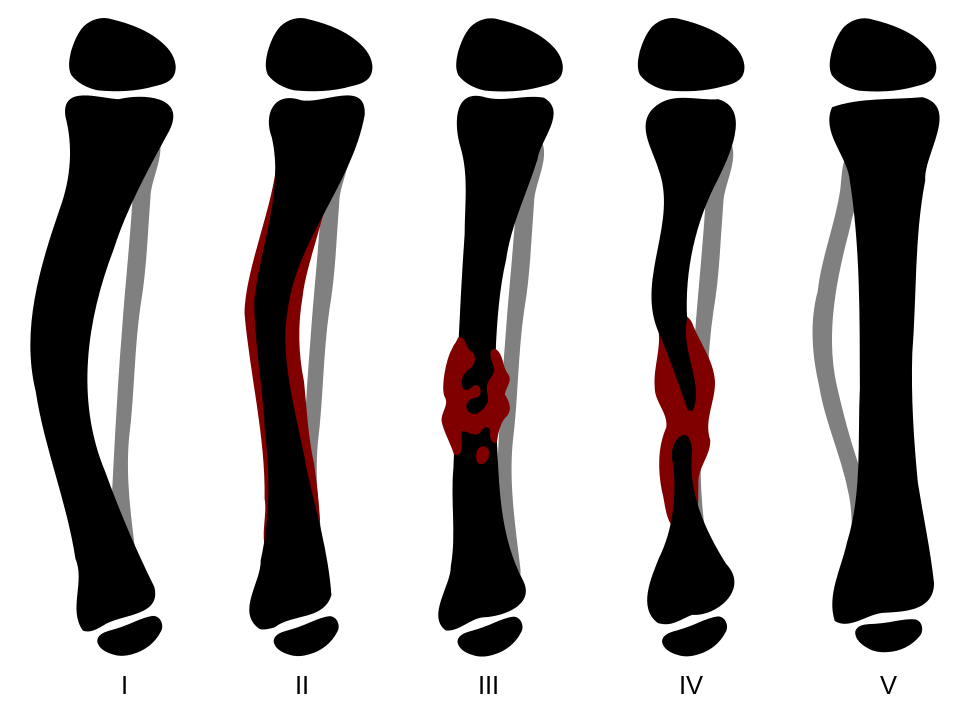
Boyd classification Type I - V

Boyd classification
Type	Findings
I	Anterior bowing associated with other congenital malformations
II	Anterior bowing with an hourglass appearance to the tibia. A fracture usually occurs before the age of 2. The ends of the bone are thin, rounded and sclerotic with obliteration of the intramedullary canal. This type is more often associated with NF-1 and there is a poor prognosis with frequent recurrence during bone growth
III	Pseudarthrosis developing from an intraosseous cyst, usually at the middle and distal third junction. Anterior bowing can precede or follow the development of the fracture. This type has a high rate of union and recurrence is rare
IV	Sclerotic bone with no pathological bowing. The medullary canal is partially or completely obliterated. A fatigue fracture may occur and progress to pseudarthrosis. The prognosis is good if treatment begins before the fatigue fracture occurs
V	Dysplastic appearance to the fibula. Pseudarthrosis can be located on either of the two bones of the tibial segment. The prognosis is good if the lesion is located only on the fibula, extension to the tibia has a prognosis similar to type II
VI	Associated with an intraosseous fibroma or a schwannoma. The prognosis depends on the aggressiveness of the intraosseous lesion

Paley classification
Type	Findings
1	No fractures
2A	No fracture of the tibia; fractured fibula, the fibula is not dislocated
2B	No fracture of the tibia; fractured and proximally migrated fibula
3	Fractured tibia, no fracture of the fibula
4A	Tibia and fibula both fractured
4B	Tibia and fibula both fractured, the fibula is migrated proximally
4C	Bone defect of the tibia, the fibula is migrated proximally

== Pathogenesis ==
The pathogenesis of CPT remains unclear nowadays. Various theories have been proposed in previous research, including mechanical, vascular, and genetic factors. However, none of these theories provide a comprehensive explanation for the development and location of CPT.

Extensive research has highlighted the significant role of fibrous hamartoma and pathological periosteum in the development of CPT. These factors are believed to hinder bone union by interposing mechanically and disrupt normal blood supply to the affected bone. The periosteum, in particular, may create a fibrous band that increases local pressure around the bone, leading to reduced vascularization and bone atrophy. Additionally, thickening of blood vessel walls in the pseudarthrosis area may contribute to the vascularization defect.

The association of NF-1 in a substantial portion (40 to 80%) of CPT cases suggests a potential genetic disorder. Neurofibromin 1 (NF1) is a gene that codes for a protein called neurofibromin, which plays a crucial role in regulating the Ras protein—a key player in cell differentiation and proliferation. Neurofibromin normally acts as a tumor suppressor by converting Ras-GTP to an inactive form (Ras-GDP). However, mutations in the NF1 gene result in the loss of neurofibromin function, leading to sustained activation of Ras. In certain CPT cases associated with NF-1, a double activation of the NF1 gene has been observed in the pseudarthrotic tissue. This genetic abnormality which only presents in some cases, cannot solely explain the pathogenesis of CPT. The loss of neurofibromin function can lead to disturbances in the Ras-MAPK pathway, resulting in impaired osteoblastic differentiation. Additionally, overexpression of the Ras pathway can increase the activity of osteoclasts and their precursors, contributing to bone resorption in CPT and the high incidence of recurrent fractures. In this case, the underlying pathogenic mechanisms of CPT likely involve a combination of signal abnormalities that enhance osteoclast activity, along with disturbances in osteoblastic differentiation, ultimately leading to defective bone remodeling. These processes are further exacerbated by the diminished local vascularization in the affected area.

== Treatment ==
=== Ilizarov Fixation ===
Ilizarov fixation is an effective surgical approach for treating CPT, particularly when significant bone gaps or deformities are present. The technique involves applying an external fixator framework known as an Ilizarov apparatus. Composed of rings connected by wires and thin wires or half-pins inserted into the bone, the apparatus allows precise control over bone alignment by gradually distracting or compressing bone ends. Through application of regulated forces, the Ilizarov method stimulates new bone formation and facilitates bone union. Steady adjustments to the frame can progressively correct deformities, lengthen the bone, and induce consolidation across the pseudarthrosis site. This technique has been proven to have high healing rate and a low refracture rate later on in clinical practice.

=== Sofield Fragmentation ===
The Sofield fragmentation technique entails making numerous small bone fractures via controlled osteotomies (surgical bone cuts) in the affected region. Orthopaedic surgeons then stabilize and compress the resultant bone fragments securely using internal fixation devices like plates, screws or intramedullary rods. By intentionally fracturing the bone in a regulated manner and ensuring stability, Sofield fragmentation promotes healing while also assisting consolidation at the pseudarthrosis site.

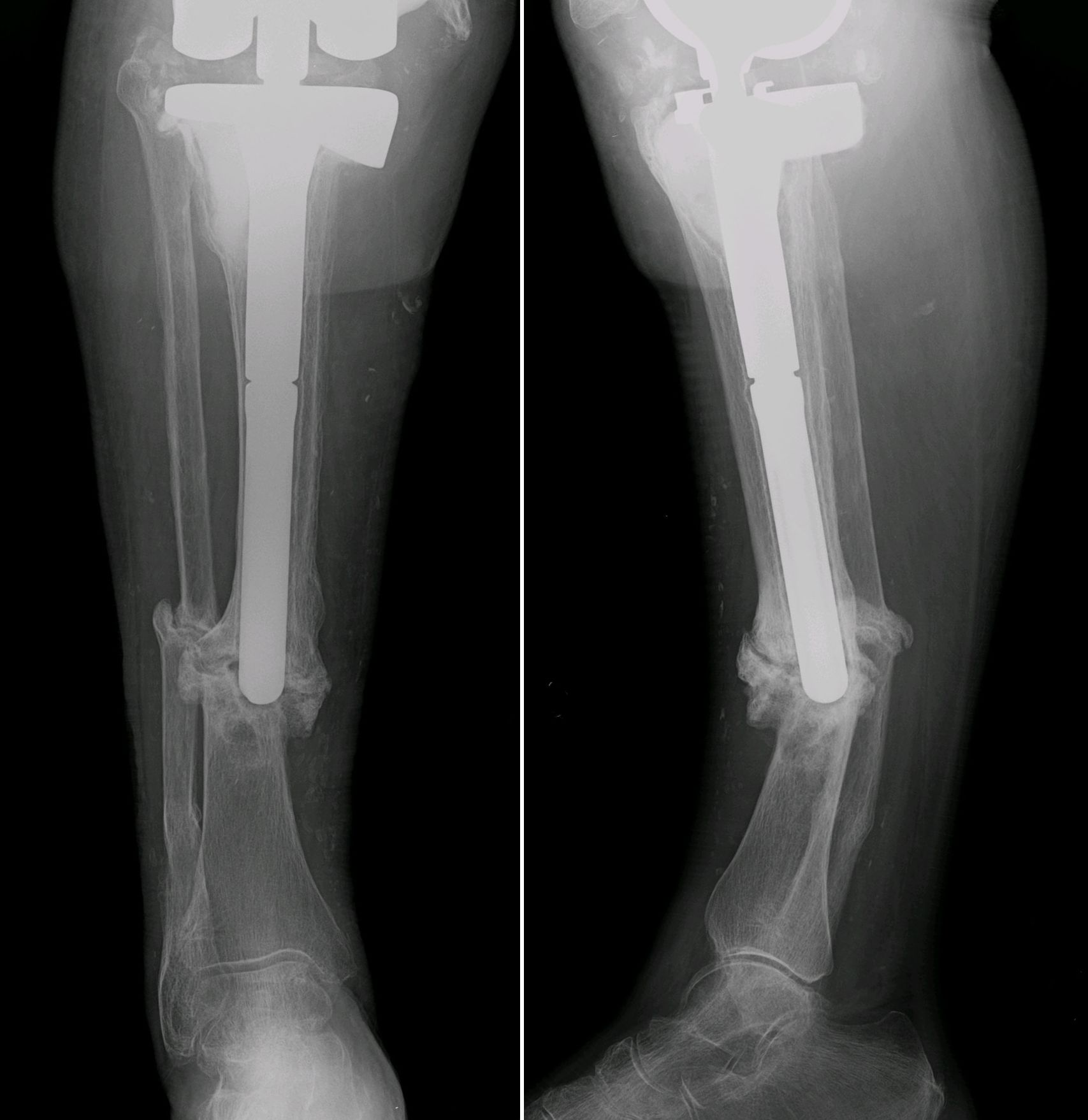
X-ray image of intramedullary nail for stabilization of the tibia

=== Intramedullary Stabilization ===
Intramedullary stabilization involves inserting a rod or nail into the tibial medullary canal. This offers structural support from within the affected bone, allowing for bone alignment and union. Surgeons may opt for flexible or rigid intramedullary nails depending on patient-specific factors such as age, pseudarthrosis severity and any accompanying deformities. Although it almost guaranteed fracture healing and no refractures within a few years, the intramedullary nails would need to be replaced with age, leading to the pain of repeated surgery.

=== Free Vascularized Fibular Grafts ===
In cases of extensive tibial bone loss or compromised blood flow, surgeons may perform a free vascularized fibular graft. This involves harvesting a section of fibula (usually 10–12 cm long) along with its blood supply from the patient's leg and transplanting it to the pseudarthrosis site. As a vascularized graft, the fibula provides a fresh blood source to aid bone growth and repair at the defect location. This unconventional procedure is reserved for the most challenging clinical presentations, saving many children with CPT from amputation since it was invented in the 1990s. However, due to the lack of mechanical support, the healed bone has a high chance of refracture if this technique was applied alone for CPT treatment. Therefore, it is commonly applied together with intramedullary nails in recent years so as to deal with both tibial loss and low bone mechanical strength, and has demonstrated satisfying efficacy in clinical practice.

== Prognosis ==
In general, 75% of CPT treatments result in initial union, with an average initial union time of 7.2 months. 35% of cases will result in refracture after treatment. Prognosis of treatment depends on several factors relating to the nature and history of the fracture. Age of diagnosis is one of the factors as fractures in older patients are associated with better prognosis. This could be due to the greater cross-sectional bone area, allowing for lower refracture rates. Early diagnosis and surgical treatment before the disease progresses is also associated with favourable results and minimized deformity. Site and type of pseudarthrosis have an impact on treatment success rate, as a lower location of fracture increases the complexity of the surgical operation due to the proximity with the ankle joint. More severe types of pseudarthrosis, such as those with severe bone deformities and significant leg length shortening is also associated with poor prognosis. Patients with a history of multiple surgical interventions and recurrent fractures also indicate poor prognosis, and suggest a high risk of refracture after treatment.

== Epidemiology ==
CPT is a rare disease in children, with an estimated frequency of 1 in 150,000 births. Few epidemiological studies for CPT have been done, so the racial and gender distribution is unknown. From its association with NF-1, it is found that around 50 percent of cases of CPT develop from NF-1, though recent studies found the percentage may be as high as 84%, due to CPT being diagnosed before other more subtle signs of NF-1 appear. In NF-1 cases, CPT occurs in infancy in approximately 5 percent of persons, with a male predominance of 1.7:1.
