= Evelyn Brower Man =

American biochemist

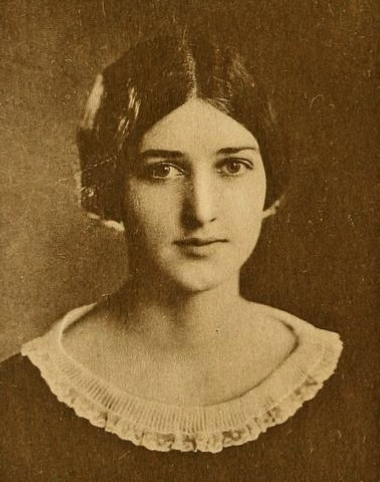
- Evelyn B. Man, from the 1925 yearbook of Wellesley College
- Born: October 7, 1904; Lawrence, New York, U.S.
- Died: September 3, 1992 (aged 87); West Hartford, Connecticut, U.S.
- Occupations: Technician; researcher; professor

Evelyn Brower Man (October 7, 1904 – September 3, 1992) was an American biochemist. She was a leading woman in developing the first test to detect hormone levels in the thyroid gland.

== Early life and education ==
Evelyn B. Man was born in Lawrence, New York, but she grew up in North Stonington, Connecticut. Man's father, Edward Man, was an attorney from New York City and her mother was Mary Hewitt Man.

Man graduated from Wheeler High School, and then, in 1925, she graduated from Wellesley College with a degree in chemistry. Man graduated from Yale with a doctorate degree in physiological chemistry in 1932.

== Career ==
From 1928 to 1961, Man worked as a researcher, and technician, and then a professor at Yale. She worked at Lafayette B. Mendel's physiological chemistry lab at Yale with John P. Peters and Herman Yannet where they developed the first test to detect hormone levels in the thyroid gland. The test was called Butanol-Extractable Iodine (BEI) test. In 1961, Man continued her research at Brown University, where she discovered infants with low hormone levels in the thyroid gland later developed a cognitive disability as children. Man advocated for infants to get their thyroid hormone levels tested. Man also studied the effects of nuclear radiation on the thyroid gland in Japanese survivors, as well as publishing works on infancy, pregnancy, and lipidemia and iodemia in health.

In 1970, Man retired from Brown University. Throughout her career, Man published 156 scientific papers and published her last paper in 1991.

For her work, Man was awarded the American Thyroid Association's Distinguished Service Award in 1976 and the United Cerebral Palsy Award for Research.

== Death ==
On September 3, 1992, Man died of lung cancer in her home in West Hartford, Connecticut. Man was 87 years old at the time of her death.
