= Palisaded encapsulated neuroma =

- Other names: Solitary circumscribed neuroma
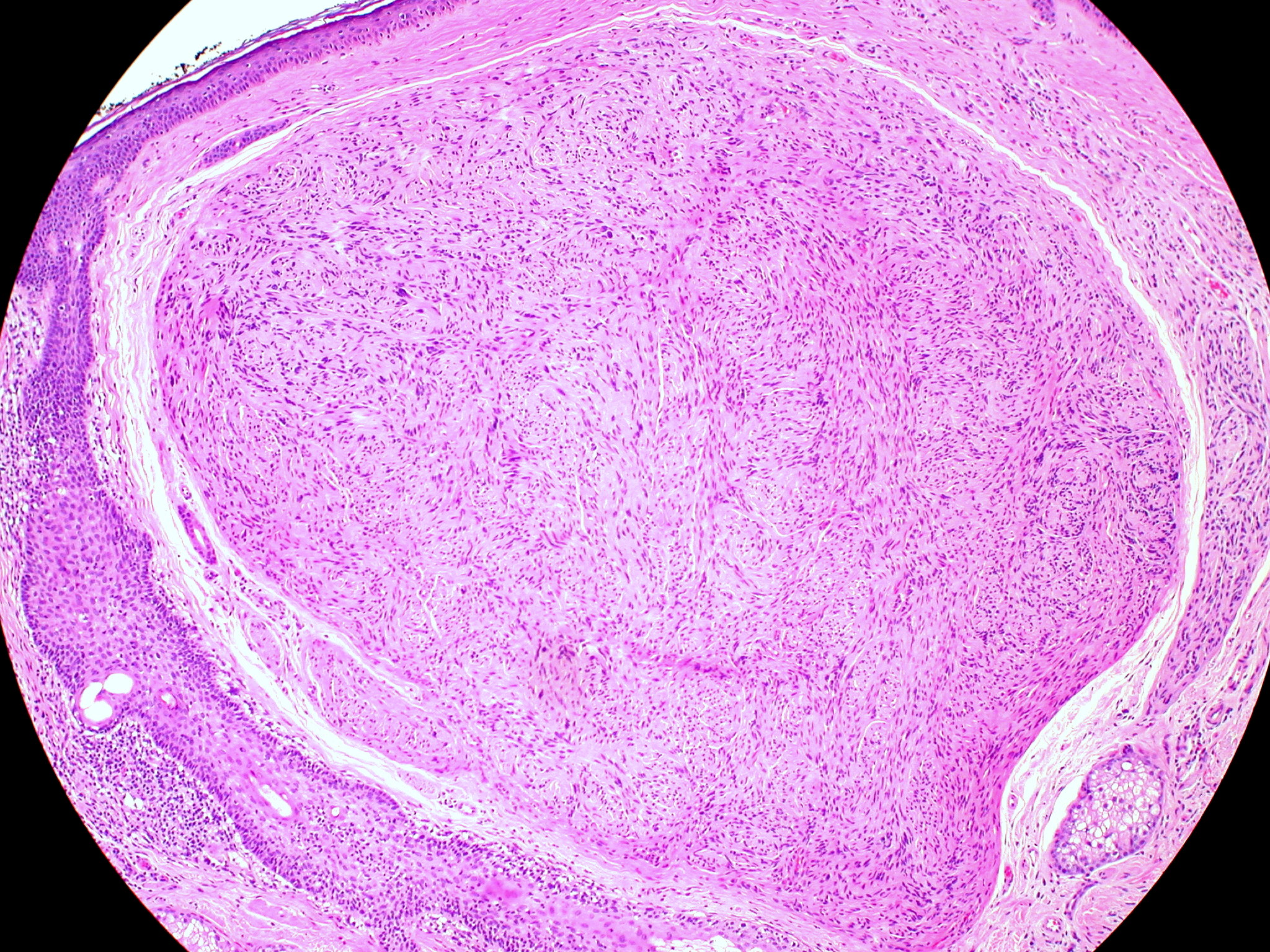
- Micrograph of a palisaded encapsulated neuroma
- Specialty: Dermatology
- Diagnostic method: Histopathology
- Differential diagnosis: Neurofibroma, basal cell carcinoma, melanocytic nevus, epidermoid cyst, skin appendage
- Treatment: Surgical excision

Palisaded encapsulated neuroma (PEN) is a rare, benign cutaneous condition characterized by small, firm, non-pigmented nodules or papules. They typically occur as a solitary (single) lesion near the mucocutaneous junction of the skin of the face, although they can occur elsewhere on the body.

== Symptoms ==
PEN tumours are always painless, solid masses felt on the skin that, due to their slow-growing nature, typically take many years to grow to a size where they are noticeable. There are never any symptoms associated with systemic disease.

== Diagnosis ==
As mentioned previously, PEN is a benign, firm, flesh-coloured lesion that typically occurs in dermis of the skin of the face. The lesions are typically between 2–6mm and are slow-growing.

On the face, the lesions can be found on the eyelid, nose and in the oral mucosa, however, the lesions can also occur on the shoulder, arm, hand, foot and the glans of the penis.

PEN is diagnosed by clinical recognition of the lesion and on subsequent histologic examination. Typically, the lesions are suspected to be schwannomas or neurofibromas clinically with PEN being an incidental finding on histology.

PEN is typically diagnosed in patients between the ages of 40 and 60 years and occurs more frequently in females than males. The diagnosis of PEN may be difficult, even with confirmatory histology, due to its histological similarities with schwannomas and neurofibromas. It is imperative that the correct diagnosis is made the misdiagnosis of a neurofibroma may lead to unnecessary further investigation into associated systemic syndromes such as neurofibromatosis type 1 or multiple endocrine neoplasia syndrome.

The differential diagnosis for PEN includes a neurofibroma, basal cell carcinoma, melanocytic nevus, epidermoid cyst and a skin appendage.

== Treatment ==
The only definitive treatment of PEN is surgical excision. Excision is curative and rarely recur.

== Gallery ==
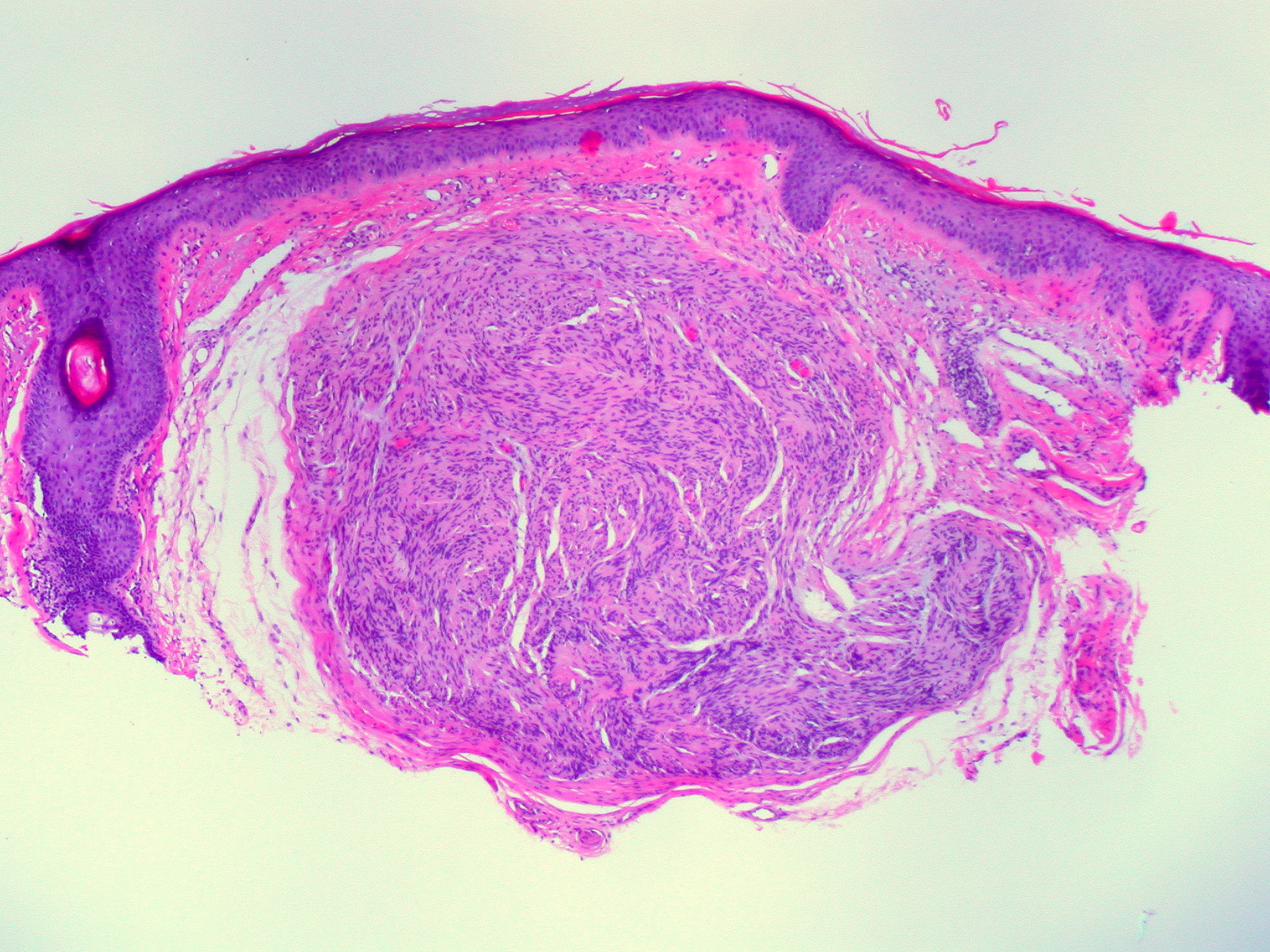

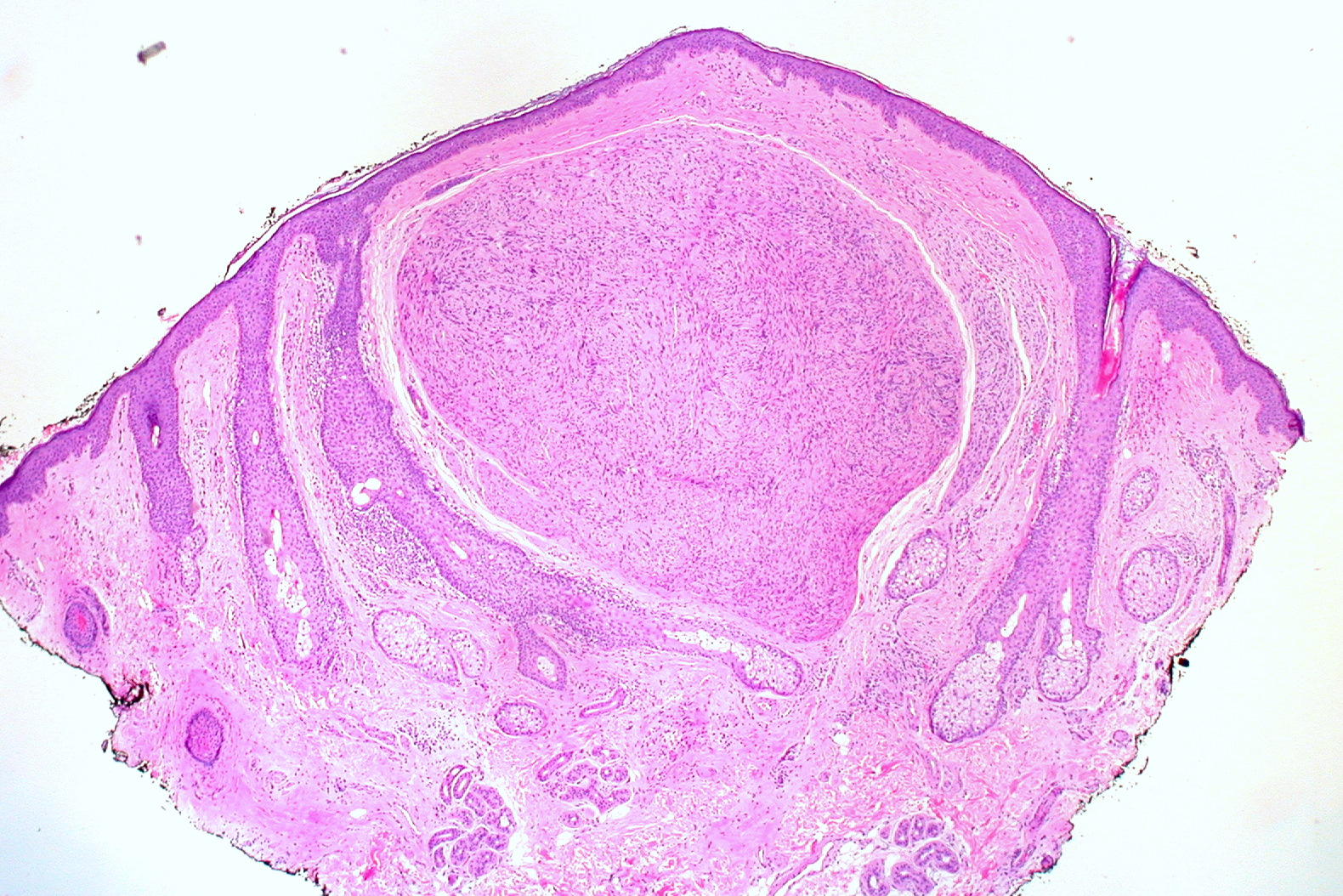

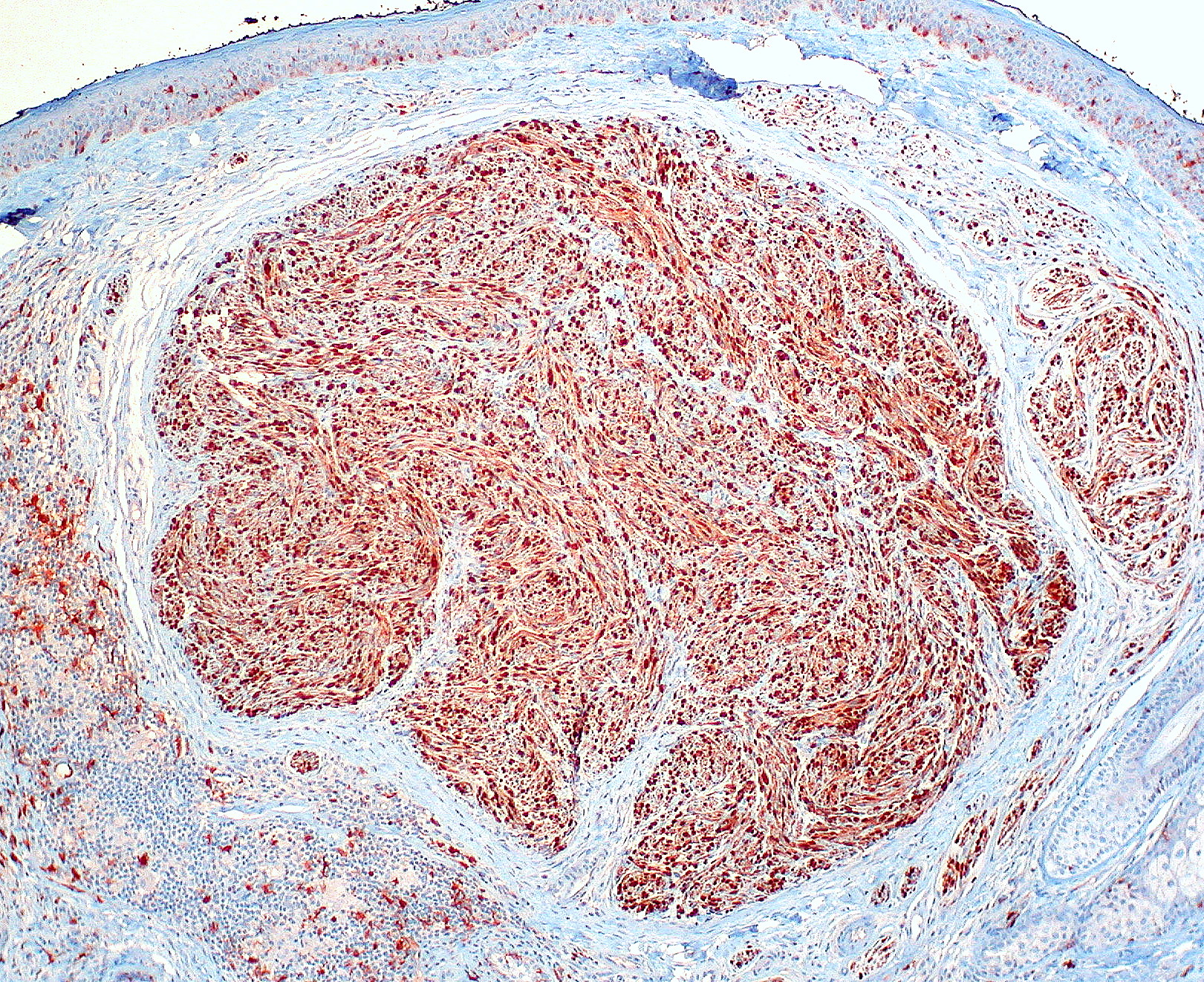

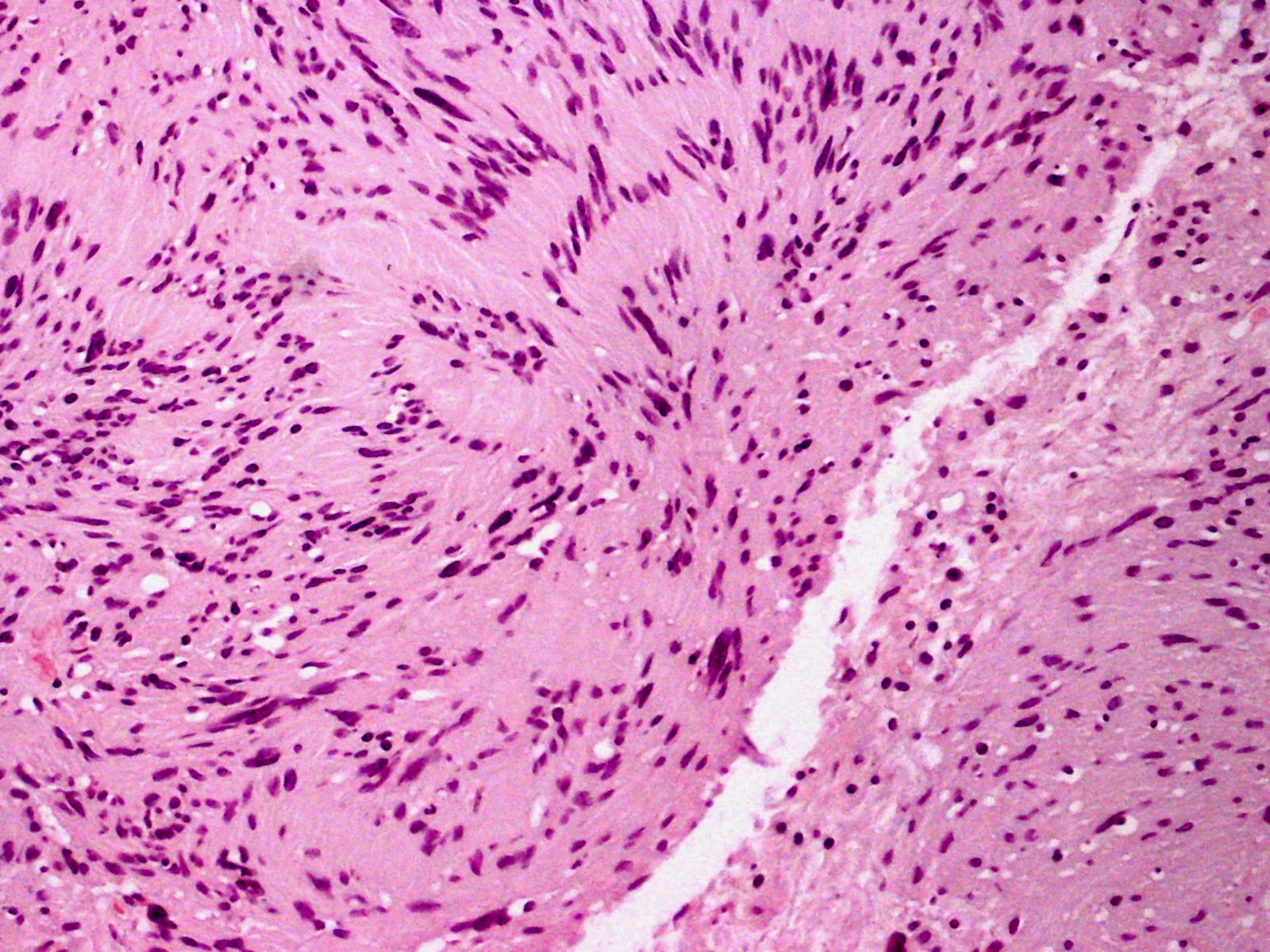

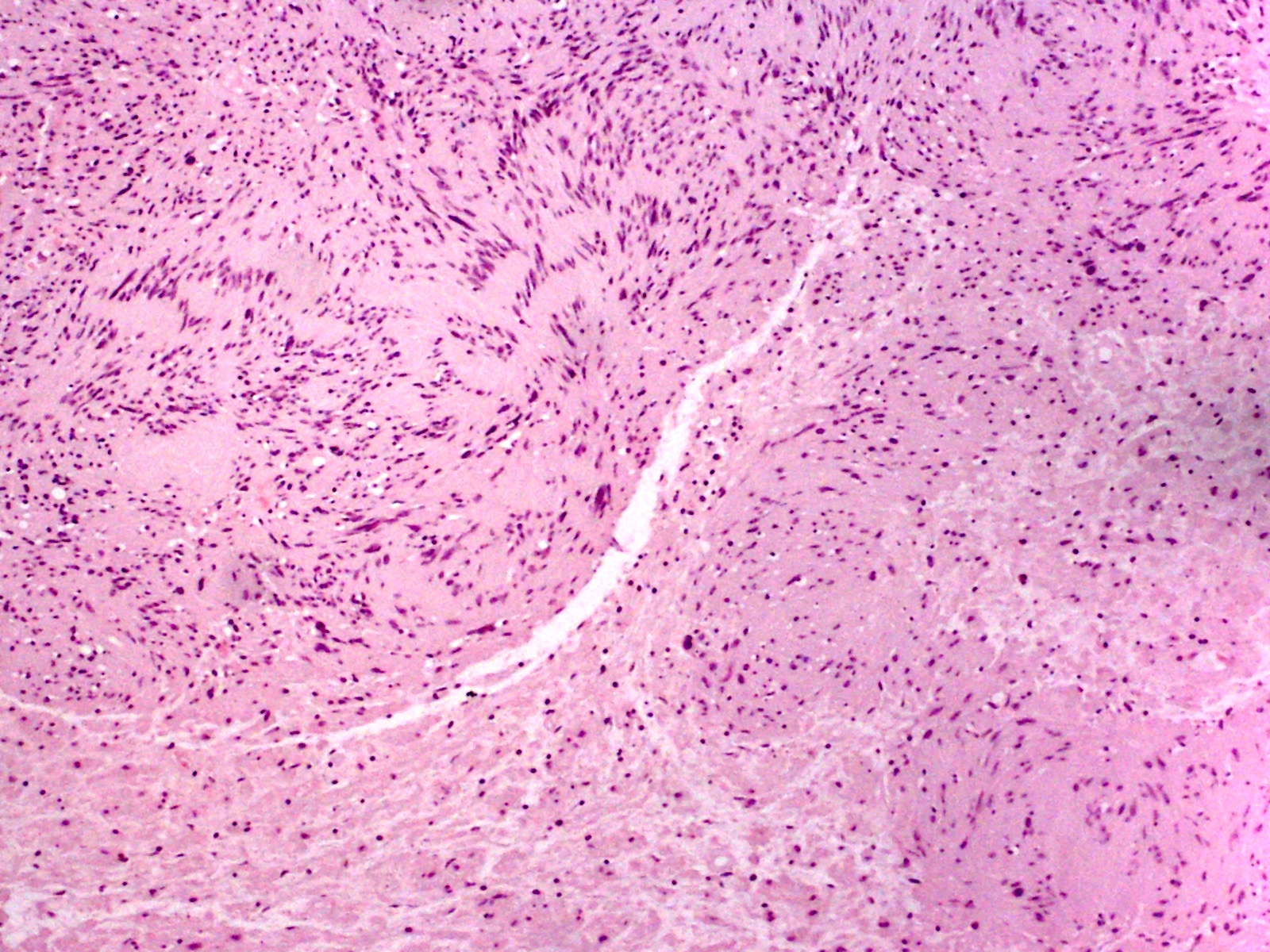

== See also ==
- List of cutaneous conditions
