= Mirdametinib =

Medication

Clinical data
- Trade names: Gomekli
- Other names: PD-0325901
- AHFS/Drugs.com: Monograph
- MedlinePlus: a625043
- License data: US DailyMed: Mirdametinib
- Routes of administration: By mouth
- Drug class: Antineoplastic
- ATC code: L01EE05 (WHO)

Legal status
- Legal status: US: ℞-only; EU: Rx-only

Identifiers
- CAS Number: 391210-10-9
- PubChem CID: 9826528
- IUPHAR/BPS: 7935
- DrugBank: DB07101
- ChemSpider: 10814340
- UNII: 86K0J5AK6M
- KEGG: D11675
- ChEBI: CHEBI:9826528
- ChEMBL: ChEMBL507361
- PDB ligand: 4BM (PDBe, RCSB PDB)
- CompTox Dashboard (EPA): DTXSID0044024
- ECHA InfoCard: 100.213.070

Chemical and physical data
- Formula: C_{16}H_{14}F_{3}IN_{2}O_{4}
- Molar mass: 482.198 g·mol^{−1}
- 3D model (JSmol): Interactive image
- SMILES: O=C(NOCC(O)CO)C1=CC=C(F)C(F)=C1NC2=CC=C(I)C=C2F
- InChI: InChI=1S/C16H14F3IN2O4/c17-11-3-2-10(16(25)22-26-7-9(24)6-23)15(14(11)19)21-13-4-1-8(20)5-12(13)18/h1-5,9,21,23-24H,6-7H2,(H,22,25)/t9-/m1/s1; Key:SUDAHWBOROXANE-SECBINFHSA-N

Mirdametinib, sold under the brand name Gomekli, is a medication used for the treatment of people with neurofibromatosis type 1. Mirdametinib is a kinase inhibitor. It is taken by mouth.

Mirdametinib was approved for medical use in the United States in February 2025.

== Medical uses ==
Mirdametinib is indicated for the treatment of people with neurofibromatosis type 1 who have symptomatic plexiform neurofibromas not amenable to complete resection.

== Adverse effects ==
The most common adverse reactions in adults include rash, diarrhea, nausea, musculoskeletal pain, vomiting, and fatigue. The most common grade 3 or 4 laboratory abnormalities include increased creatine phosphokinase. The most common adverse reactions in children include rash, diarrhea, musculoskeletal pain, abdominal pain, vomiting, headache, paronychia, left ventricular dysfunction, and nausea. The most common grade 3 or 4 laboratory abnormalities include decreased neutrophil count and increased creatine phosphokinase.

Mirdametinib can cause left ventricular dysfunction and ocular toxicity including retinal vein occlusion, retinal pigment epithelial detachment, and blurred vision.

== History ==
The efficacy of mirdametinib was evaluated in ReNeu (NCT03962543), a multicenter, single-arm trial in 114 participants aged two years of age and older (58 adults, 56 pediatric participants) with symptomatic, inoperable NF1-associated plexiform neurofibromas causing significant morbidity. An inoperable plexiform neurofibromas was defined as a plexiform neurofibromas that could not be completely surgically removed without risk for substantial morbidity due to encasement or close proximity to vital structures, invasiveness, or high vascularity.

The US Food and Drug Administration (FDA) granted the application for mirdametinib priority review, fast track, and orphan drug designations along with a priority review voucher.

== Society and culture ==
=== Legal status ===
Mirdametinib was approved for medical use in the United States in February 2025.

In May 2025, the Committee for Medicinal Products for Human Use of the European Medicines Agency adopted a positive opinion, recommending the granting of a conditional marketing authorization for the medicinal product Ezmekly, intended for the treatment of plexiform neurofibromas (PN) in adults and children from two years of age with neurofibromatosis type 1 (NF1). The applicant for this medicinal product is SpringWorks Therapeutics Ireland Limited. Mirdametinib was authorized for medical use in the EU in July 2025.
