= Neurofibromin =

Mammalian protein found in humans

NF1
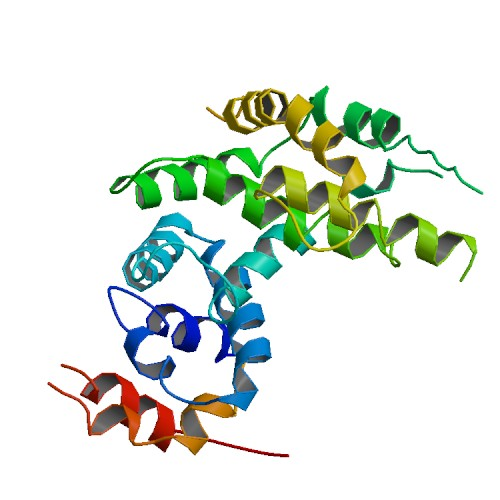

Identifiers
- Aliases: NF1, NFNS, VRNF, WSS, neurofibromin 1
- External IDs: OMIM: 613113; MGI: 97306; GeneCards: NF1
Available structures
PDB	Ortholog search: PDBe RCSB
PDB	List of PDB id codes 2D4Q, 2E2X, 3P7Z, 3PEG, 3PG7

Gene location (Human)
Chr.	Chromosome 17 (human)
Band	17q11.2	Start	31,094,927 bp
Band	17q11.2	End	31,382,116 bp

Gene location (Mouse)
Chr.	Chromosome 11 (mouse)
Band	11 B5|11 46.74 cM	Start	79,230,519 bp
Band	11 B5|11 46.74 cM	End	79,472,438 bp
RNA expression pattern
Bgee	Human / Mouse (ortholog); Top expressed in: epithelium of colon; Achilles tendon; secondary oocyte; ventricular zone; buccal mucosa cell; sural nerve; ganglionic eminence; testicle; corpus callosum; corpus epididymis / Top expressed in: spermatocyte; spermatid; tail of embryo; genital tubercle; lumbar subsegment of spinal cord; neural layer of retina; superior frontal gyrus; dentate gyrus of hippocampal formation granule cell; ventricular zone; primary visual cortex; More reference expression data
BioGPS	n/a
Gene ontology
Molecular function	phosphatidylcholine binding; protein binding; phosphatidylethanolamine binding; lipid binding; GTPase activator activity
Cellular component	cytosol; membrane; intrinsic component of the cytoplasmic side of the plasma membrane; nucleolus; axon; dendrite; presynapse; cytoplasm; nucleus
Biological process	cellular response to heat; regulation of angiogenesis; negative regulation of cell-matrix adhesion; positive regulation of extrinsic apoptotic signaling pathway in absence of ligand; observational learning; negative regulation of cell population proliferation; negative regulation of astrocyte differentiation; regulation of long-term neuronal synaptic plasticity; regulation of MAPK cascade; regulation of GTPase activity; glutamate secretion, neurotransmission; amygdala development; negative regulation of Rac protein signal transduction; neural tube development; cognition; negative regulation of cell migration; regulation of gene expression; positive regulation of extrinsic apoptotic signaling pathway via death domain receptors; negative regulation of neurotransmitter secretion; positive regulation of endothelial cell proliferation; gamma-aminobutyric acid secretion, neurotransmission; negative regulation of osteoclast differentiation; negative regulation of endothelial cell proliferation; regulation of blood vessel endothelial cell migration; regulation of cell population proliferation; regulation of long-term synaptic potentiation; negative regulation of angiogenesis; skeletal muscle tissue development; regulation of synaptic transmission, GABAergic; extrinsic apoptotic signaling pathway via death domain receptors; signal transduction; positive regulation of GTPase activity; Schwann cell development; adrenal gland development; spinal cord development; MAPK cascade; phosphatidylinositol 3-kinase signaling; development of the heart; positive regulation of neuron apoptotic process; peripheral nervous system development; wound healing; sympathetic nervous system development; osteoblast differentiation; positive regulation of apoptotic process; negative regulation of fibroblast proliferation; forebrain astrocyte development; metanephros development; negative regulation of MAP kinase activity; pigmentation; liver development; visual learning; regulation of glial cell differentiation; artery morphogenesis; positive regulation of adenylate cyclase activity; negative regulation of Ras protein signal transduction; regulation of bone resorption; extracellular matrix organization; actin cytoskeleton organization; cerebral cortex development; negative regulation of protein kinase activity; Ras protein signal transduction; forebrain morphogenesis; negative regulation of oligodendrocyte differentiation; regulation of cell-matrix adhesion; smooth muscle tissue development; brain development; collagen fibril organization; myelination in peripheral nervous system; camera-type eye morphogenesis; cell communication; response to hypoxia; negative regulation of neuroblast proliferation; negative regulation of MAPK cascade; hair follicle maturation; negative regulation of protein import into nucleus
Sources:Amigo / QuickGO
Orthologs
Databases	NCBI: entry; OMA: entry
Species	Human	Mouse
Entrez	4763	18015
Ensembl	ENSG00000196712	ENSMUSG00000020716
UniProt	P21359	Q04690
RefSeq (mRNA)	NM_000267; NM_001042492; NM_001128147	NM_010897
RefSeq (protein)	NP_000258; NP_001035957; NP_001121619	NP_035027
Location (UCSC)	Chr 17: 31.09 – 31.38 Mb	Chr 11: 79.23 – 79.47 Mb
PubMed search
- Wikidata
View/Edit Human	View/Edit Mouse

Neurofibromin (NF-1) is a protein that is encoded in humans, in the NF1 gene. NF1 is located on chromosome 17. Neurofibromin, a GTPase-activating protein that negatively regulates RAS/MAPK pathway activity by accelerating the hydrolysis of Ras-bound GTP. NF1 has a high mutation rate and mutations can alter cellular growth control, and neural development, resulting in various presentations (depending on the specific allele expressed) such as Watson syndrome and neurofibromatosis type 1 (NF1, also known as von Recklinghausen syndrome). Symptoms of NF1 include disfiguring cutaneous neurofibromas (CNF), café au lait pigment spots, plexiform neurofibromas (PN), skeletal defects, optic nerve gliomas, life-threatening malignant peripheral nerve sheath tumors (MPNST), pheochromocytoma, attention deficits, learning deficits and other cognitive disabilities.

== Gene ==
NF1 was cloned in 1990 and its product neurofibromin was identified in 1992. Neurofibromin, a GTPase-activating protein, primarily regulates the protein Ras. NF1 is located on the long arm of chromosome 17, position q11.2 NF1 spans over 350-kb of genomic DNA and contains 62 exons. 58 of these exons are constitutive and 4 exhibit alternative splicing ( 9a, 10a-2, 23a, and 28a). The genomic sequence starts 4,951-bp upstream of the transcription start site and 5,334-bp upstream of the translation initiation codon, with the length of the 5' UTR being 484-bp long.

There are three genes that are present within intron 27b of NF1. These genes are EVI2B, EVI2A and OMG, which are encoded on the opposite strand and are transcribed in the opposite direction of NF1. EVI2A and EVI2B are human homologs of the Evi-2A and Evi-2B genes in mice that encode proteins related to leukemia in mice. OMG is a membrane glycoprotein that is expressed in the human central nervous system during myelination of nerve cells.

=== Promoter ===
Early studies of the NF1 promoter found that there is great homology between the human and mouse NF1 promoters. The major transcription start site has been confirmed, as well as two minor transcription start sites in both the human and mouse gene.

The major transcription start is 484-bp upstream of the translation initiation site. The open reading frame is 8,520-bp long and begins at the translation initiation site. NF1 exon 1 is 544-bp long, contains the 5' UTR and encodes the first 20 amino acids of neurofibromin. The NF1 promoter lies within a CpG island that is 472-bp long, consisting of 43 CpG dinucleotides, and extends into the start of exon 1. This CpG Island begins 731-bp upstream of the promoter and no core promoter element, such as a TATA or CCATT box, has been found within it. Although no core promoter element has been found, consensus binding sequences have been identified in the 5' UTR for several transcription factors such as Sp1 and AP2.

A methylation map of five regions of the promoter in both mouse and human was published in 1999. This map showed that three of the regions (at approximately – 1000, – 3000, and – 4000) were frequently methylated, but the cytosines near the transcription start site were unmethylated. Methylation has been shown to functionally impact Sp1 sites as well as a CREB binding site. It has been shown that the CREB site must be intact for normal promoter activity to occur and methylation at the Sp1 sites may affect promoter activity.

Proximal NF1 promoter/5' UTR methylation has been analyzed in tissues from NF1 patients, with the idea that reduced transcription as a result of methylation could be a "second hit" mechanism equivalent to a somatic mutation. There are some sites that have been detected to be methylated at a higher frequency in tumor tissues than normal tissues. These sites are mostly within the proximal promoter; however, some are in the 5' UTR as well and there is a lot of interindividual variability in the cytosine methylation in these regions.

=== 3' UTR ===
A study in 1993 compared the mouse NF1 cDNA to the human transcript and found that both the untranslated regions and coding regions were highly conserved. It was verified that there are two NF1 polyadenylated transcripts that differ in size because of the length of the 3' UTR, which is consistent with what has been found in the mouse gene.

A study conducted in 2000 examined whether the involvement of the 3' UTR in post-transcriptional gene regulation had an effect on the variation of NF1 transcript quantity both spatially and temporally. Five regions of the 3' UTR that appear to bind proteins were found, one of which is HuR, a tumor antigen. HuR binds to AU-rich elements which are scattered throughout the 3' UTR and are thought to be negative regulators of transcript stability. This supports the idea that post-transcriptional mechanisms may influence the levels of NF1 transcript.

=== Mutations ===
NF1 has one of the highest mutation rates amongst known human genes, however mutation detection is difficult because of its large size, the presence of pseudogenes, and the variety of possible mutations. The NF1 locus has a high incidence of de novo mutations, meaning that the mutations are not inherited maternally or paternally. Although the mutation rate is high, there are no mutation "hot spot" regions. Mutations tend to be distributed within the gene, although exons 3, 5, and 27 are common sites for mutations.

The Human Gene Mutation Database contains 1,347 NF1 mutations, but none are in the "regulatory" category. There have not been any mutations conclusively identified within the promoter or untranslated regions. This may be because such mutations are rare, or they do not result in a recognizable phenotype.

There have been mutations identified that affect splicing, in fact 286 of the known mutations are identified as splicing mutations. About 78% of splicing mutations directly affect splice sites, which can cause aberrant splicing to occur. Aberrant splicing may also occur due to mutations within a splicing regulatory element. Intronic mutations that fall outside of splice sites also fall under splicing mutations, and approximately 5% of splicing mutations are of this nature. Point mutations that effect splicing are commonly seen and these are often substitutions in the regulatory sequence. Exonic mutations can lead to deletion of an entire exon, or a fragment of an exon if the mutation creates a new splice site. Intronic mutations can result in the insertion of a cryptic exon, or result in exon skipping if the mutation is in the conserved 3' or 5' end.

== Protein ==
NF1 encodes neurofibromin (NF1), which is a 320-kDa protein that contains 2,818 amino acids. Neurofibromin is a GTPase-activating protein (GAP) that negatively regulates Ras pathway activity by accelerating hydrolysis of Ras-bound guanosine triphosphate (GTP). Neurofibromin localizes in the cytoplasm; however, some studies have found neurofibromin or fragments of it in the nucleus. Neurofibromin does contain a nuclear localization signal that is encoded by exon 43, but whether or not neurofibromin plays a role in the nucleus is currently unknown. Neurofibromin is ubiquitously expressed, but expression levels vary depending on the tissue type and developmental stage of the organism. Expression is at its highest level in adult neurons, Schwann cells, astrocytes, leukocytes, and oligodendrocytes.

The catalytic RasGAP activity of neurofibromin is located in a central portion of the protein, that is called the GAP-related domain (GRD). The GRD is closely homologous to RasGAP and represents about 10% (229 amino acids) of the neurofibromin sequence. The GRD is made up of a central portion called the minimal central catalytic domain (GAPc) as well as an extra domain (GAPex) that is formed through the coiling of about 50 residues from the N- and C- terminus. The Ras-binding region is found in the surface of GAPc and consists of a shallow pocket that is lined by conserved amino acid residues.

In addition to the GRD, neurofibromin also contains a Sec14 homology-like region as well as a pleckstrin homology-like (PH) domain. Sec14 domains are defined by a lipid binding pocket that resembles a cage and is covered by a helical lid portion that is believed to regulate ligand access. The PH-like region displays a protrusion that connects two beta-strands from the PH core that extend to interact with the helical lid found in the Sec14 domain. The function of the interaction between these two regions is presently unclear, but the structure implies a regulatory interaction that influences the helical-lid conformation in order to control ligand access to the lipid binding pocket.

Neurofibromin also contains two short leucine/isoleucine-rich motifs, termed M1 and M2, that mediate direct binding to estrogen receptor-α (see Function). These motifs are evolutionarily conserved among vertebrates but are absent from NF1 homologs in Drosophila and yeast, organisms that lack an ER ortholog. Residues within M1 and M2 are recurrently mutated in cancer, including ER-positive breast cancer.

=== Function ===
Through its NF1-GRD domain, neurofibromin increases the rate of GTP hydrolysis of Ras, and acts as a tumor suppressor by reducing Ras activity. When the Ras-Nf1 complex assembles, active Ras binds in a groove that is present in the neurofibromin catalytic domain. This binding occurs through Ras switch regions I and II, and an arginine finger present in neurofibromin. The interaction between Ras and neurofibromin causes GAP-stimulated hydrolysis of GTP to GDP. This process depends on the stabilization of residues in the Ras switch I and switch II regions, which drives Ras into the confirmation required for enzymatic function. This interaction between Ras and neurofibromin also requires the transition state of GDP hydrolysis to be stabilized, which is performed through the insertion of the positively charged arginine finger into the Ras active site. This neutralizes the negative charges that are present on GTP during phosphoryl transfer. By hydrolyzing GTP to GDP, neurofibromin inactivates Ras and therefore negatively regulates the Ras pathway, which controls the expression of genes involved in apoptosis, the cell cycle, cell differentiation or migration.

Neurofibromin is also known to interact with CASK through syndecan, a protein which is involved in the KIF17/ABPA1/CASK/LIN7A complex, which is involved in trafficking GRIN2B to the synapse. This suggests that neurofibromin has a role in the transportation of the NMDA receptor subunits to the synapse and its membrane. Neurofibromin is also believed to be involved in the synaptic ATP-PKA-cAMP pathway, through modulation of adenylyl cyclase. It is also known to bind the caveolin 1, a protein which regulates p21ras, PKC and growth response factors.

Neurofibromin also serves as a transcriptional co-repressor for estrogen receptor-α (ER), independent of GAP activity, in breast cancer. Neurofibromin binds ER directly through Leu/Ile-rich motifs, a feature common among ER co-regulators. NF1-silencing/knockout in ER+ breast cancer cell lines enhances estrogen-dependent gene expression, causing resistance to tamoxifen and estrogen deprivation. Consistent with co-repressor behavior, neurofibromin shuttles in and out of the nucleus in a CRM1-dependent manner, and its nuclear localization is stimulated by tamoxifen.

=== Isoforms ===
There are currently five known isoforms of neurofibromin (II, 3, 4, 9a, and 10a-2) and these isoforms are generated through the inclusion of alternative splicing exons (9a, 10a-2, 23a, and 48a) that do not alter the reading frame. These five isoforms are expressed in distinct tissues and are each detected by specific antibodies.

- Neurofibromin type II, also named GRD2 (domain II-related GAP), results from the insertion of exon 23a, which causes the addition of 21 amino acids in the 5' region of the protein. Neurofibromin type II is expressed in Schwann cells and has reduced GAP activity.
- Neurofibromin type 3 (also called isoform 3' ALT) contains exon 48a which results in the insertion of 18 amino acids into the 3' terminal.
- Neurofibromin type 4 contains exons 23a and 48a, which results in the insertion of 21 amino acids in the 5' region, and 18 amino acids in the 3' terminal.
- Neurofibromin 9a (also referred to as 9br), includes exon 9a which results in the insertion of 10 amino acids in the 5' region. This isoform shows little neuronal expression and may play a role in memory and learning mechanisms.
- An isoform with insertion of exon 10a-2 has been studied introduces a transmembrane domain. The inclusion of exon 10a-2 causes the insertion of 15 amino acids in the 5' region. This isoform is expressed in most human tissues, therefore it likely performs a housekeeping function in intracellular membranes.

It has been suggested that the quantitative differences in expression between the different isoforms may be related to the phenotypic variability of neurofibromatosis type 1 patients.

== RNA editing ==
In the NF1 mRNA, there is a site within the first half of the GRD where mRNA editing occurs. Deamination occurs at this site, resulting in the conversion of cytidine into uridine at nucleotide 3916. This deamination changes an arginine codon (CGA) to an in-frame translation stop codon (UGA). If the edited transcript is translated, it produces a protein that cannot function as a tumor suppressor because the N-terminal of the GRD is truncated. The editing site in NF1 mRNA was shown to have high homology to the ApoB editing site, where double stranded mRNA undergoes editing by the ApoB holoenzyme. NF1 mRNA editing was believed to involve the ApoB holoenzyme due to the high homology between the two editing sites, however studies have shown that this is not the case. The editing site in NF1 is longer than the sequence required for ApoB mediated mRNA editing, and the region contains two guanidines which are not present in the ApoB editing site.

== Clinical significance ==
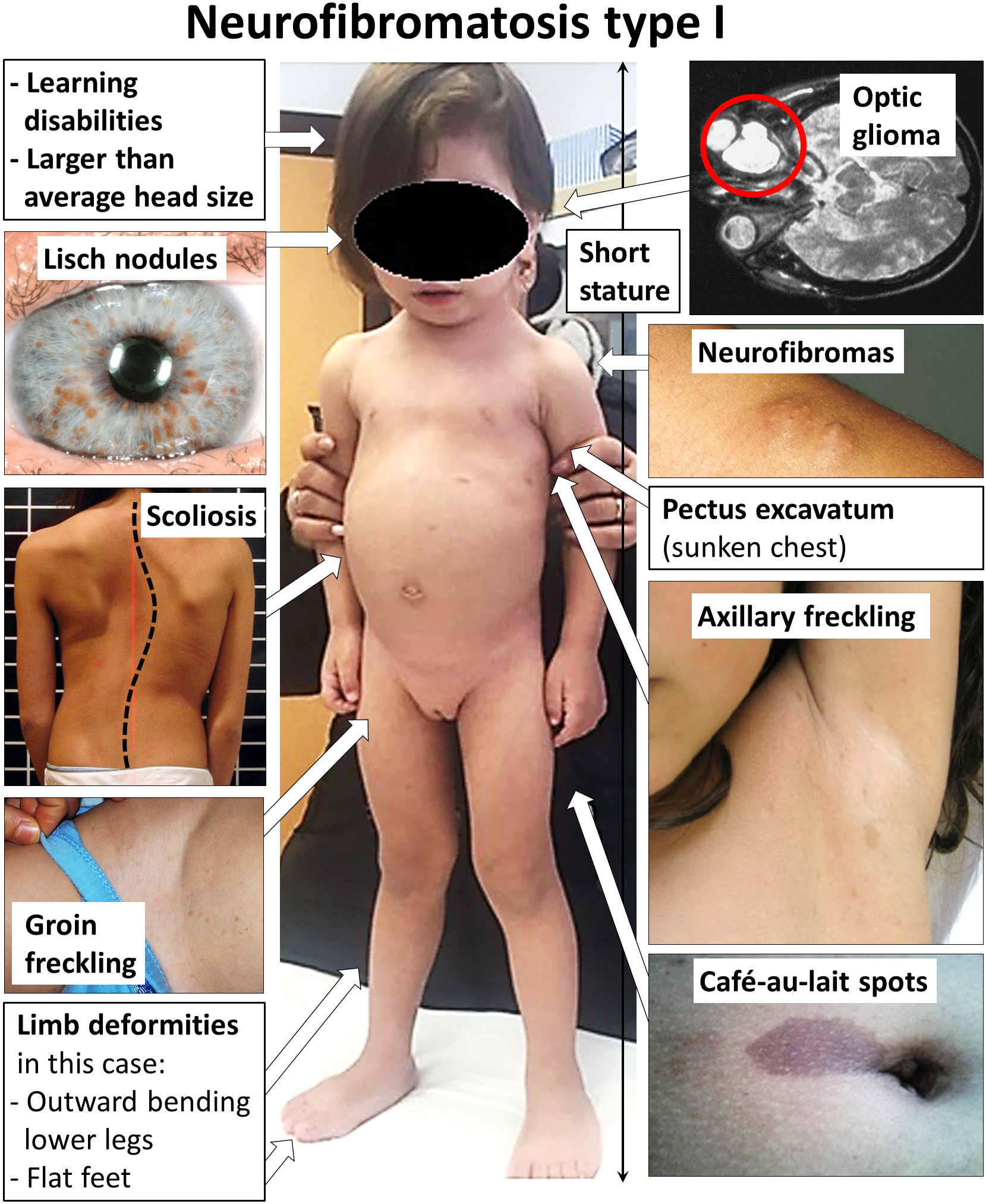
Main symptoms of neurofibromatosis type I

Mutations in NF1 are primarily associated with neurofibromatosis type 1 (NF1, also known as von Recklinghausen syndrome). NF1 is the most common single gene disorder in humans, occurring in about 1 in 2500–3000 births worldwide. NF1 is an autosomal dominant disorder, but approximately half of NF1 cases arise from de novo mutations. NF1 has high phenotypic variability, with members of the same family with the same mutation displaying different symptoms and symptom intensities. Café-au-lait spots are the most common sign of NF1, but other symptoms include Lisch nodules of iris, cutaneous neurofibromas (CNF), plexiform neurofibromas (PN), skeletal defects, optic nerve gliomas, life-threatening malignant peripheral nerve sheath tumors (MPNST), attention deficits, learning deficits and other cognitive disabilities.

In addition to neurofibromatosis type I, mutations in NF1 can also lead to juvenile myelomonocytic leukemias (JMML), gastrointestinal stromal tumors (GIST), Watson syndrome, astrocytic neoplasms, phaeochromocytomas and breast cancer.

No effective therapy for NF1 yet exists. Instead, people with neurofibromatosis are followed by a team of specialists to manage symptoms or complications. However, in April, 2020, the FDA approved selumetinib (brand name Koselugo) for the treatment of pediatric patients 2 years of age and older with neurofibromatosis type 1 (NF1) who have symptomatic, inoperable plexiform neurofibromas (PN).

NF1 mutations and reduced mRNA and protein expression are associated with resistance to endocrine therapy in ER+ breast cancer.

== Model organisms ==
A lot about of our knowledge on the biology of NF1 came from model organisms including the fruit fly Drosophila melanogaster, the zebrafish Danio rerio and the mouse Mus musculus, which all contain an NF1 ortholog in their genome (no NF1 ortholog exists in the nematode Caenorhabditis elegans.) Research based on these preclinical models has already proven its efficacy as multiple clinical assays have been initiated subsequently regarding neurofibromatosis type 1-related plexiform neurofibromas, gliomas, MPNST and neurocognitive disorders.

=== Mouse models ===
In 1994, the first NF1 genetically engineered knockout mice were published: homozygosity for the Nf1 mutation (Nf1^{-/-}) induced severe developmental cardiac abnormalities that led to embryonic lethality at early stages of the development, pointing out that NF1 plays a fundamental role in normal development. On the contrary, Nf1 heterozygous animals (Nf1^{+/-}) were viable but predisposed to form different types of tumors. In some of these tumor cells, genetic events of loss of heterozygosity (LOH) were observed, supporting that NF1 functions as a tumor suppressor gene.

The development of several other NF1 mouse models has also allowed the implementation of preclinical research to test the therapeutic potential of targeted pharmacologic agents, such as sorafenib (VEGFR, PDGFR and RAF kinases inhibitor) and everolimus (mTORC inhibitor) for the treatment of NF1 plexiform neurofibromas, sirolimus (rapamycin) (mTORC inhibitor) for MPNSTs, or lovastatin (HMG-CoA reductase inhibitor), and alectinib (ALK inhibitor) for NF1 cognitive and learning disabilities.

In 2013, two conditional knockout mouse models, called Dhh-Cre;Nf1^{flox/flox} (which develops neurofibromas similar to those found in NF1 patients) and Mx1-Cre;Nf1^{flox/flox} (which develops myeloproliferative neoplasms similar to those found in NF1 juvenile myelomonocytic leukemia/JMML) were used to study the effects of the specific MEK inhibitor PD032590 on tumor progression. The inhibitor demonstrated a remarkable response in tumor regression and in hematologic improvement. Based on these results, phase I and later phase II clinical trials were then conducted in children with inoperable NF1-related plexiform neurofibromas, using Selumetinib, an oral selective MEK inhibitor used previously in several advanced adult neoplasms. The children enrolled in the study benefited from the treatment without suffering from excessive toxic effects, and treatment induced partial responses in 72% of them. These unprecedented and promising results from the phase II SPRINT trial, led, first in 2018, both the Food and Drug Administration (FDA) and the European Medicines Agency to grant selumetinib an Orphan Drug Status for the treatment of neurofibromatosis type 1, and then, a few months later in 2019, FDA to grant a Breakthrough Therapy Designation to the inhibitor.

=== Drosophila melanogaster ===
The Drosophila melanogaster ortholog gene of human NF1 (dNF1) has been identified and cloned in 1997. The gene is slightly more compact than its human counterpart but still remains one of the largest genes of the fly genome. It encodes a protein 55% identical and 69% similar to human neurofibromin over its entire 2,802 amino acid length. It comprises an IRA-related central segment containing the catalytic GAP-related domain (GRD), which are both highly similar to their human counterparts. Also, other conserved regions exist both up- and downstream of this domain.

dNF1, like its human counterpart, is mainly expressed in the developing and adult nervous system and primarily controls the MAPK RAS/ERK signaling pathway.

Through the use of several mutant null alleles of dNF1 that have been generated, its role has been progressively elucidated. dNF1 functions to regulate organism growth and whole-body size (first elucidated by the rescue study of The et al. 1997), synaptic growth, neuromuscular junction function, circadian clock and rhythmic behaviors, mitochondrial function, and learning (also found in The) including associative learning and long-term memory. Large scale genetic and functional screens have also led to the identification of dominant modifier genes responsible for the dNF1-associated defects. The et al. 1997 found the size defect to be rescuable by transgenic modification by either a working NF1 or a protein kinase – but this works only during development and not in adulthood.

Interestingly, whole-body size deficits, learning defects and aberrant RAS/ERK signaling are also key features of the NF1 condition in humans, and are all due to a deregulation of the anaplastic lymphoma kinase ALK-NF1-RAS/ERK signaling pathway in flies. Pharmacological treatment using a highly-specific ALK inhibitor corrected all these defects in flies and this therapeutic approach was later successfully validated in a preclinical mouse model of NF1 by treating mice with Alectinib, suggesting it represents a promising therapeutic target.

== See also ==
- Merlin (protein)
- SPRED1 gene
