= Watson syndrome =

- This condition is inherited in an autosomal dominant manner.
- Specialty: Medical genetics

Watson syndrome is a rare genetic condition characterised by brownish patches of skin, short stature, pulmonary stenosis, developmental delays, and learning difficulties. Its inheritance is autosomal dominant, and it may also occur with Lisch nodules of the ocular iris, axillary/inguinal freckling, and neurofibromas. Watson syndrome is caused by mutations in the NF1 gene, the same gene associated with neurofibromatosis type 1. It is believed that Watson syndrome and neurofibromatosis-1 result from allelic mutations at the NF1 locus.

Watson syndrome has sometimes been described as a 'milder form' of neurofibromatosis-1 due to shared features including mutation of the NF1 gene, café-au-lait patches, and neurofibroma, variably presenting with similar cognitive and physiological features to Noonan syndrome, a genetic condition resulting in developmental delays, learning disability, cardiovascular abnormalities, and short stature. The pathophysiology of all three conditions fits into the RASopathy model.

== See also ==
- Westerhof syndrome
- List of cutaneous conditions
