= Westerhof syndrome =

- This condition is inherited in an autosomal dominant manner.
- Specialty: Dermatology

Westerhof syndrome is a cutaneous condition inherited in an autosomal dominant fashion, characterized by congenital hypopigmented macules.

== See also ==
- Watson syndrome
- List of cutaneous conditions
