= Lawrence, New York =

Lawrence, New York may refer to:

- Lawrence, Nassau County, New York, a village
- Lawrence, St. Lawrence County, New York, a town
