= Optic nerve glioma =

Glial cell tumor of the optic nerve

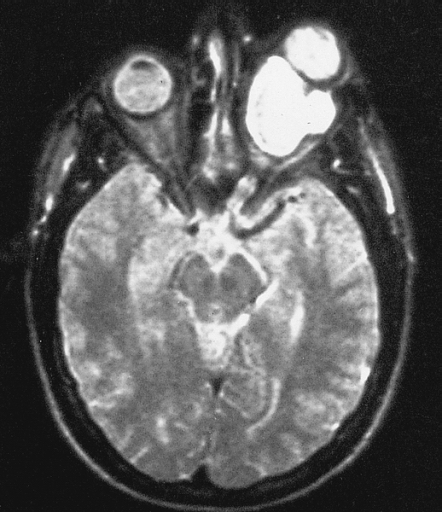
- Magnetic resonance image of a large retrobulbar optic nerve tumor causing massive proptosis
- Specialty: Oncology

Optic nerve glioma (or optic glioma), a form of glioma which affects the optic nerve, is often one of the central nervous system manifestations of neurofibromatosis 1.

Optic gliomas are usually pilocytic tumors, and can involve the optic nerve or optic chiasm. Optic gliomas are usually associated with neurofibromatosis type 1 in 30% of people with the condition.

Optic nerve gliomas have low mortality but extremely high prevalence of vision loss and eye-bulging exophthalmos in children. As of 2014, approximately 1000 cases had been reported.

== Diagnosis ==
Optic nerve gliomas are diagnosed using magnetic resonance imaging (MRI) and CT scans. The tumor adopts a fusiform appearance, appearing wider in the middle and tapered at the ends. Enlargement of the optic nerve along with a downward kink in the mid-orbit is usually observed. While CT scans allow for optic nerve evaluation, MRI allows for intracranial evaluation to observe if the tumor has extended to other regions such as the optic chiasm and hypothalamus.

== Treatment ==
The main goal of treating optic gliomas is to preserve vision for as long as possible. The tumor's slow and self-limiting growth indicates that it is not immediately problematic in most benign cases, with long-term studies showing that people with optic glioma may still have stable functional vision without intervention. As a result, the first and preferred course of action is usually observation of optic glioma over time.

Once the first signs of visual deterioration and/or tumor progression are observed, interventional treatments will then commence. These include radiation therapy, chemotherapy and surgical excision. While being the most effective therapy, radiation has shown damaging effects on the already compromised intellect as well as an increase in vascular issues and second tumor formation in children with neurofibromatosis 1. However, fractionated stereotactic radiation therapy (FSRT) is gaining traction as the most preferred interventional treatment for optic nerve glioma due to its combination of the therapeutic efficiency of radiation therapy without the negative side effects. Chemotherapy has also been shown to be a safer alternative to most radiation therapies and surgery for very young children (under the age of 3). However, the optimal chemotherapeutic therapy has not been defined, with risks of different toxicities still observed in older children. Surgery is considered the final choice of treatment, due to the high risk of blindness and damage to the affected eye. It is considered in only certain scenarios, such as relieving a cosmetically unappealing bulging eye (exophthalmos), removing an enlarging and/or expanding tumor or a combination of both.

== Prognosis ==
Optic gliomas alternate between periods of inactivity and growth, making their clinical presentation variable and clinical course unpredictable. Once the optic chiasm is involved, the prognosis for life and vision worsens.
