= Disabilities affecting intellectual abilities =

Subnormal intellectual functioning (cognitive disorder)

There are a variety of disabilities affecting intellectual ability. This is a broad concept encompassing various intellectual or cognitive deficits, including intellectual disability (formerly called mental retardation), deficits too mild to properly qualify as intellectual disability, and problems acquired later in life through acquired brain injuries or neurodegenerative diseases like dementia.

Many of these disabilities have an effect on memory, which is the ability to recall what has been learned over time. Typically memory is moved from sensory memory to working memory, and then finally into long-term memory. People with cognitive disabilities typically will have trouble with one of these types of memory.

== Intellectual disability ==
Intellectual disability, also known as general learning disability, and previously known as mental retardation (a term now considered offensive), is a generalized disorder characterized by significantly impaired cognitive functioning and deficits in two or more adaptive behaviors that appears before adulthood. It has historically been defined as an Intelligence Quotient (IQ) score under 70, but the definition now includes both one component relating to mental functioning and one relating to individuals' functional skills in their environment, so IQ is not the only factor.

Intellectual disability must have appeared in the developmental period, not only as an adult. By contrast, people with cognitive impairment have, or previously had, normal IQ, but now show confusion, forgetfulness and difficulty concentrating; cognitive impairment is typical of brain injuries, side effects from medications, and dementia.

== Acquired brain injuries ==
An acquired brain injury (ABI) is brain damage caused by events after birth, rather than as part of a genetic or congenital disorder. It usually affects cognitive, physical, emotional, social or independent functioning. ABIs can result from either a traumatic brain injury or a non-traumatic injury such as stroke, infection or substance abuse. Most definitions of ABI exclude neurodegenerative disorders.

People with a brain injury may have difficulty controlling, coordinating and communicating their thoughts and actions. They may or may not retain their intellectual abilities, depending on the type and extent of the injury. However, the intellectual abilities of a person with a brain injury are likely to be interfered with by the resulting thought coordination and communication difficulties, which can make it difficult for them to express themselves in a manner intelligible to others. This may give the false impression of a damaged intelligence even in people with normal intellectual capacity.

== Neurodegenerative diseases ==
Neurodegenerative diseases all involve the progressive loss of structure or function of neurons, including the death of neurons. Many neurodegenerative diseases including Parkinson's, Alzheimer's, and Huntington's occur as a result of neurodegenerative processes. As research progresses, many similarities appear which relate these diseases to one another on a sub-cellular level. Discovering these similarities offers hope for therapeutic advances that could ameliorate many diseases simultaneously.

Dementia is a serious loss of cognitive ability in a previously unimpaired person, beyond what might be expected from normal aging. Both dementia and intellectual disability are defined by neurologists as having an IQ that is two standard deviations below median (below about 70, when 100 is the median); the difference between these two classifications for intellectual disability is whether the low IQ represents a lifelong condition (intellectual disability), or a condition that is acquired later (dementia).

Dementia may be static, the result of a unique global brain injury, or progressive, resulting in long-term decline due to damage or disease in the body. In the early stages of Alzheimer's disease, whose symptoms of dementia are called mild cognitive impairment, the person typically loses 8 to 10 IQ points per year, with the result that a person of previously normal intelligence usually becomes intellectually disabled in less than five years.

== Living with cognitive disability ==
Research documents the importance of providing those with intellectual disabilities alternative spaces and contexts where they feel included and can assert their own definitions of ability and what it is to be "normal."
