= Fibroblast growth factor receptor 1 =

Protein found in humans

FGFR1

Identifiers
- Aliases: FGFR1, BFGFR, CD331, CEK, FGFBR, FGFR-1, FLG, FLT-2, FLT2, HBGFR, HH2, HRTFDS, KAL2, N-SAM, OGD, bFGF-R-1, ECCL, fibroblast growth factor receptor 1
- External IDs: OMIM: 136350; MGI: 95522; GeneCards: FGFR1
Available structures
PDB	Ortholog search: PDBe RCSB
PDB	List of PDB id codes 1AGW, 1CVS, 1EVT, 1FGI, 1FGK, 1FQ9, 1XR0, 2CR3, 2FGI, 3C4F, 3DPK, 3GQI, 3GQL, 3JS2, 3KRJ, 3KRL, 3KXX, 3KY2, 3RHX, 3TT0, 4F63, 4F64, 4F65, 4NK9, 4NKA, 4NKS, 4RWI, 4RWJ, 4RWK, 4RWL, 4UWY, 4WUN, 5AM6, 5AM7, 4ZSA, 5A4C, 4UWB, 4UWC, 5A46, 5FLF, 5EW8, 5B7V
Enzyme activity
EC #	BRENDA	ExPASy	KEGG	MetaCyc
2.7.10.1	↗	↗	↗	↗

Gene location (Human)
Chr.	Chromosome 8 (human)
Band	8p11.23	Start	38,400,215 bp
Band	8p11.23	End	38,468,834 bp

Gene location (Mouse)
Chr.	Chromosome 8 (mouse)
Band	8 A2|8 14.12 cM	Start	26,003,670 bp
Band	8 A2|8 14.12 cM	End	26,065,734 bp
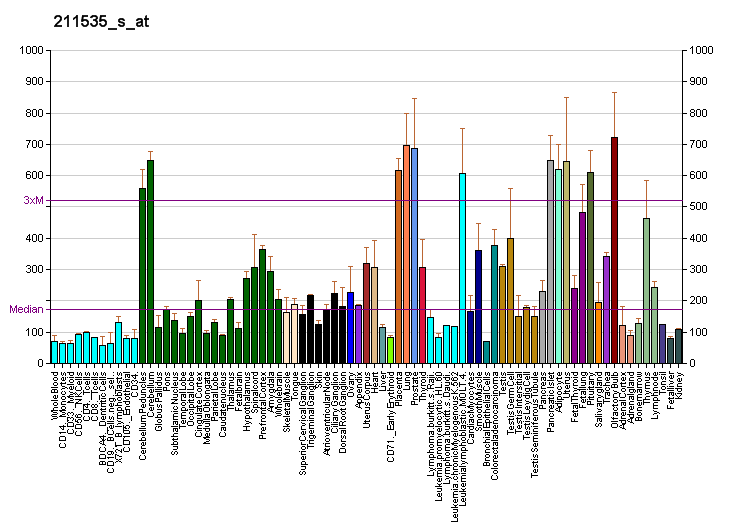

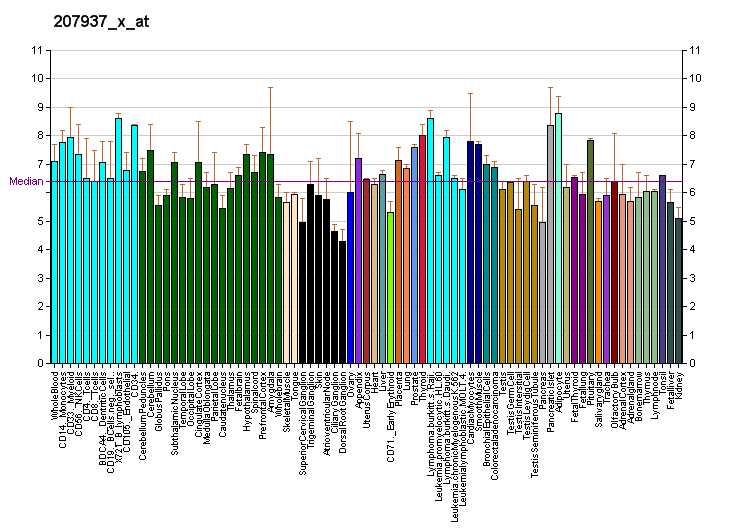
RNA expression pattern
Bgee	Human / Mouse (ortholog); Top expressed in: buccal mucosa cell; stromal cell of endometrium; Achilles tendon; right ovary; paraflocculus of cerebellum; left ovary; right coronary artery; left uterine tube; right hemisphere of cerebellum; Descending thoracic aorta / Top expressed in: molar; decidua; body of femur; pontine nuclei; gastrula; ventricular zone; lip; ankle; calvaria; median eminence; More reference expression data
BioGPS	More reference expression data
Gene ontology
Molecular function	kinase activity; transmembrane receptor protein tyrosine kinase activity; ATP binding; protein kinase activity; transferase activity; protein homodimerization activity; protein binding; nucleotide binding; identical protein binding; fibroblast growth factor binding; fibroblast growth factor-activated receptor activity; heparin binding; 1-phosphatidylinositol-3-kinase activity; protein tyrosine kinase activity; phosphatidylinositol-4,5-bisphosphate 3-kinase activity; receptor-receptor interaction; receptor tyrosine kinase; transmembrane signaling receptor activity; SH2 domain binding
Cellular component	cytoplasm; cytosol; membrane; extracellular region; nucleus; receptor complex; integral component of plasma membrane; cytoplasmic vesicle; plasma membrane; integral component of membrane; nucleolus
Biological process	skeletal system development; ureteric bud development; fibroblast growth factor receptor signaling pathway involved in orbitofrontal cortex development; positive regulation of endothelial cell chemotaxis to fibroblast growth factor; positive regulation of MAP kinase activity; positive regulation of phospholipase C activity; regulation of branching involved in salivary gland morphogenesis by mesenchymal-epithelial signaling; positive regulation of cardiac muscle cell proliferation; mesenchymal cell differentiation; positive regulation of mesenchymal cell proliferation; angiogenesis; orbitofrontal cortex development; positive regulation of MAPKKK cascade by fibroblast growth factor receptor signaling pathway; branching involved in salivary gland morphogenesis; regulation of transcription, DNA-templated; blood vessel morphogenesis; regulation of extrinsic apoptotic signaling pathway in absence of ligand; lung development; in utero embryonic development; cell maturation; negative regulation of gene expression; transcription, DNA-templated; positive regulation of cell cycle; embryonic limb morphogenesis; positive regulation of neuron differentiation; protein autophosphorylation; auditory receptor cell development; positive regulation of MAPK cascade; paraxial mesoderm development; chondrocyte differentiation; organ induction; phosphorylation; ventricular zone neuroblast division; skeletal system morphogenesis; neuron migration; outer ear morphogenesis; negative regulation of transcription by RNA polymerase II; middle ear morphogenesis; regulation of gene expression; phosphatidylinositol-mediated signaling; midbrain development; chordate embryonic development; hearing; salivary gland morphogenesis; generation of neurons; MAPK cascade; regulation of lateral mesodermal cell fate specification; positive regulation of phospholipase activity; brain development; regulation of cell population proliferation; inner ear morphogenesis; positive regulation of neuron projection development; regulation of cell differentiation; positive regulation of phosphatidylinositol 3-kinase signaling; peptidyl-tyrosine phosphorylation; lung-associated mesenchyme development; cell migration; phosphatidylinositol-3-phosphate biosynthetic process; phosphatidylinositol phosphate biosynthetic process; protein phosphorylation; fibroblast growth factor receptor signaling pathway; positive regulation of cell population proliferation; positive regulation of parathyroid hormone secretion; negative regulation of fibroblast growth factor production; vitamin D3 metabolic process; regulation of phosphorus metabolic process; positive regulation of mitotic cell cycle DNA replication; positive regulation of protein kinase B signaling; regulation of phosphate transport; positive regulation of blood vessel endothelial cell migration; positive regulation of vascular endothelial cell proliferation; ear development; negative regulation of signal transduction; cell differentiation; negative regulation of apoptotic process; positive regulation of ERK1 and ERK2 cascade; transmembrane receptor protein tyrosine kinase signaling pathway; nervous system development; positive regulation of cell differentiation
Sources:Amigo / QuickGO
Orthologs
Databases	NCBI: entry; OMA: entry
Species	Human	Mouse
Entrez	2260	14182
Ensembl	ENSG00000077782	ENSMUSG00000031565
UniProt	P11362	P16092
RefSeq (mRNA)	NM_001174063; NM_001174064; NM_001174065; NM_001174066; NM_001174067 NM_015850; NM_023105; NM_023106; NM_023107; NM_023108; NM_023109; NM_023110; NM_023111; NM_032191; NM_001354367; NM_001354368; NM_001354369; NM_001354370	NM_001079908; NM_001079909; NM_010206
RefSeq (protein)	NP_001167534; NP_001167535; NP_001167536; NP_001167537; NP_001167538 NP_056934; NP_075593; NP_075594; NP_075598; NP_001341296; NP_001341297; NP_001341298; NP_001341299	NP_001073377; NP_001073378; NP_034336
Location (UCSC)	Chr 8: 38.4 – 38.47 Mb	Chr 8: 26 – 26.07 Mb
PubMed search
- Wikidata
View/Edit Human	View/Edit Mouse

Fibroblast growth factor receptor 1 (FGFR-1), also known as basic fibroblast growth factor receptor 1, fms-related tyrosine kinase-2 / Pfeiffer syndrome, and CD331, is a receptor tyrosine kinase whose ligands are specific members of the fibroblast growth factor family. FGFR-1 has been shown to be associated with Pfeiffer syndrome, and clonal eosinophilias.

== Gene ==
The FGFR1 gene is located on human chromosome 8 at position p11.23 (i.e. 8p11.23), has 24 exons, and codes for a Precursor mRNA that is alternatively spliced at exons 8A or 8B thereby generating two mRNAs coding for two FGFR1 isoforms, FGFR1-IIIb (also termed FGFR1b) and FGFR1-IIIc (also termed FGFR1c), respectively. Although these two isoforms have different tissue distributions and FGF-binding affinities, FGFR1-IIIc appears responsible for most of functions of the FGFR1 gene while FGFR1-IIIb appears to have only a minor, somewhat redundant functional role. There are four other members of the FGFR1 gene family: FGFR2, FGFR3, FGFR4, and Fibroblast growth factor receptor-like 1 (FGFRL1). The FGFR1 gene, similar to the FGFR2-4 genes are commonly activated in human cancers as a result of their duplication, fusion with other genes, and point mutation; they are therefore classified as proto-oncogenes.

== Protein ==
=== Receptor ===
FGFR1 is a member of the fibroblast growth factor receptor (FGFR) family, which in addition to FGFR1, includes FGFR2, FGFR3, FGFR4, and FGFRL1. FGFR1-4 are cell surface membrane receptors that possess tyrosine kinase activity. A full-length representative of these four receptors consists of an extracellular region composed of three immunoglobulin-like domains which bind their proper ligands, the fibroblast growth factors (FGFs), a single hydrophobic stretch which passes through the cell's surface membrane, and a cytoplasmic tyrosine kinase domain. When bonded to FGFs, these receptors form dimers with any one of the four other FGFRs and then cross-phosphorylate key tyrosine residues on their dimer partners. These newly phosphorylated sites bind cytosolic docking proteins such as FRS2, PRKCG and GRB2 which proceed to activate cell signaling pathways that lead to cellular differentiation, growth, proliferation, prolonged survival, migration, and other functions. FGFRL1 lacks a prominent intracellular domain and tyrosine kinase activity; it may serve as a decoy receptor by binding with and thereby diluting the action of FGFs. There are 18 known FGFs that bind to and activate one or more of the FGFRs: FGF1 to FGF10 and FGF16 to FGF23. Fourteen of these, FGF1 to FGF6, FGF8, FGF10, FGF17, and FGF19 to FGF23 bind and activate FGFR1. FGFs binding to FGFR1 is promoted by their interaction with cell surface heparan sulfate proteoglycans and, with respect to FGF19, FGF20, and FGR23, the transmembrane protein Klotho.

=== Cell activation ===
FGFR1, when bound to a proper FGF, elicits cellular responses by activating signaling pathways that include the: a) Phospholipase C/PI3K/AKT, b) Ras subfamily/ERK, c) Protein kinase C, d) IP_{3}-induced raising of cytosolic Ca^{2+}, and e) Ca^{2+}/calmodulin-activated elements and pathways. The exact pathways and elements activated depend on the cell type being stimulated plus other factors such as the stimulated cells microenvironment and previous as well as concurrent history of stimulation

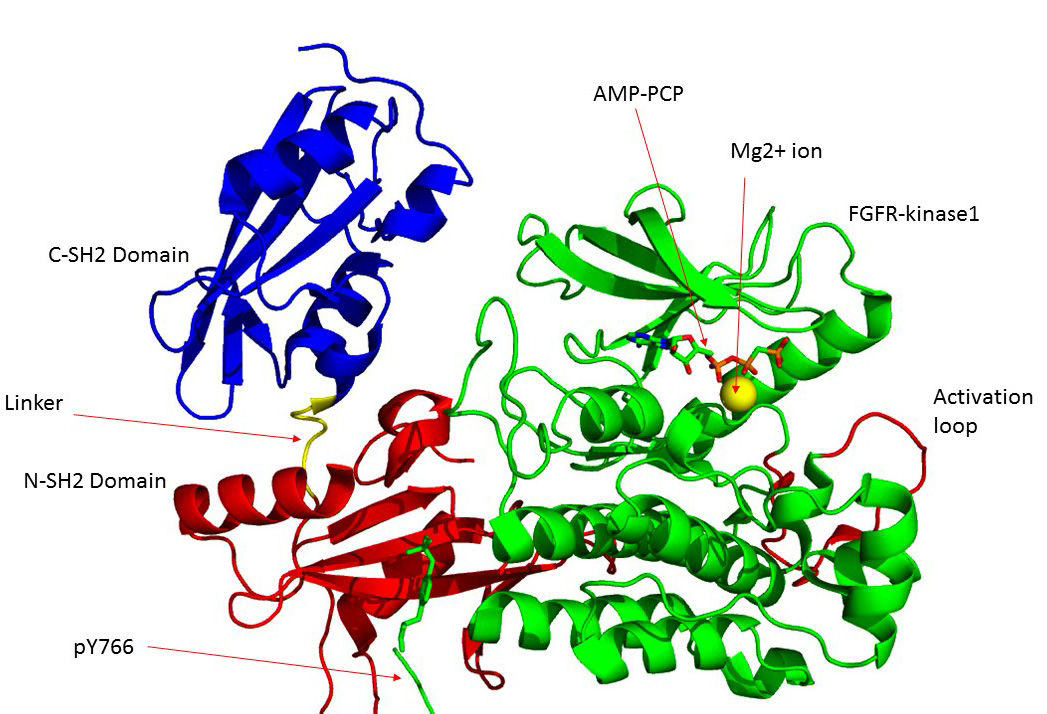
Figure 1. SH2 domains in complex with FGFR1 kinase. c-SH2 domain is colored in blue, n-SH2 domain is colored in red, and the interdomain linker is colored in yellow. FGFR1 kinase (green) interacts with n-SH2 domain at its C-terminal tail. The structure contains typical SH2 domain, with two α-helices and three antiparallel β-strands on each of the SH2 domains.

Activation of the gamma isoforms of phospholipase C (PLCγ) (see PLCG1 and PLCG2 illustrates one mechanism by which FGFR1 activates cell stimulating pathways. Following its binding of a proper FGF and subsequent pairing with another FGFR, FGFR1 becomes phosphorylated by its partner FGFR on a highly conserved tyrosine residue (Y766) at its C-terminal. This creates a binding or "docking" site to recruit PLCγ via PLCγ tandem nSH2 and cSH2 domains and then phosphorylate PLCγ. By being phosphorylated PLCγ is relieved of its auto-inhibition structure and becomes active in metabolizing nearby phosphatidylinositol 4,5-bisphosphate to two secondary messengers, inositol trisphosphate (IP_{3}) and diacyglycerol (DAG). These secondary messengers proceed to mobilize other cell-signaling and cell-activating agents: IP_{3} elevates cytosolic Ca^{2+} and thereby various Ca^{2+}-sensitive elements while DAG activates various protein kinase C isoforms.

Recent publication on the 2.5 Å crystal structure of PLCγ in complex with FGFR1 kinase (PDB: 3GQI) provides new insights in understanding the molecular mechanism of FGFR1's recruitment of PLCγ by its SH2 domains. Figure 1 on the extreme right shows the PLCγ-FGFR1 kinase complex with the c-SH2 domain colored in red, n-SH2 domain colored in blue, and the interdomain linker colored in yellow. The structure contains typical SH2 domain, with two α-helices and three antiparallel β-strands in each SH2 domain. In this complex, the phosphorylated tyrosine (pY766) on the C-terminal tail of FGFR1 kinase binds preferentially to the nSH2 domain of PLCγ. The phosphorylation of tyrosine residue 766 on FGFR1 kinase forms hydrogen bonds with the n-SH2 to stabilize the complex. Hydrogen bonds in the binding pocket help to stabilize the PLCγ-FGFR1 kinase complex. The water molecule as shown mediates the interaction of asparagine 647 (N647) and aspartate 768 (D768) to further increase the binding affinity of the n-SH2 and FGFR1 kinase complex. (Figure 2). The phosphorylation of tyrosine 653 and tyrosine 654 in the active kinase conformation causes a large conformation change in the activation segment of FGFR1 kinase. Threonine 658 is moved by 24Å from the inactive form (Figure 3.) to the activated form of FGFR1 kinase (Figure 4.). The movement causes the closed conformation in the inactive form to open to enable substrate binding. It also allows the open conformation to coordinate Mg2+ with AMP-PCP (analog of ATP). In addition, pY653 and pY654 in the active form helps to maintain the open conformation of the SH2 and FGFR1 kinase complex. However, the mechanism by which the phosphorylation at Y653 and Y654 helps to recruit the SH2 domain to its C-terminal tail upon phosphorylation of Y766 remains elusive. Figure 5 shows the overlay structure of active and inactive forms of FGFR1 kinase. Figure 6 shows the dots and contacts on phosphorylated tyrosine residues 653 and 654. Green dots show highly favorable contacts between pY653 and pY654 with surrounding residues. Red spikes show unfavorable contacts in the activation segment. The figure is generated through Molprobity extension on Pymol.

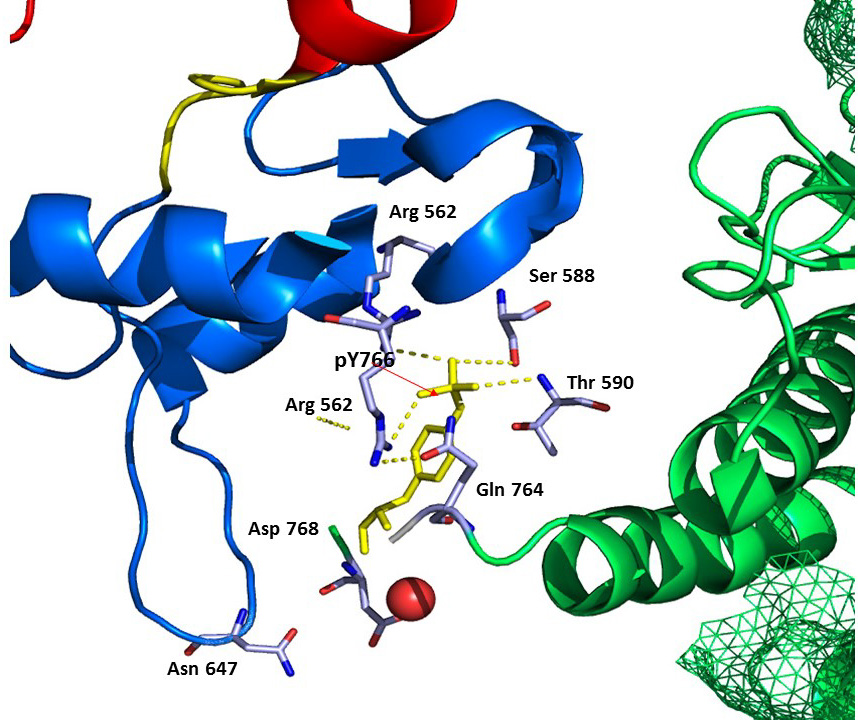
Figure 2. Hydrogen bonds at pY766

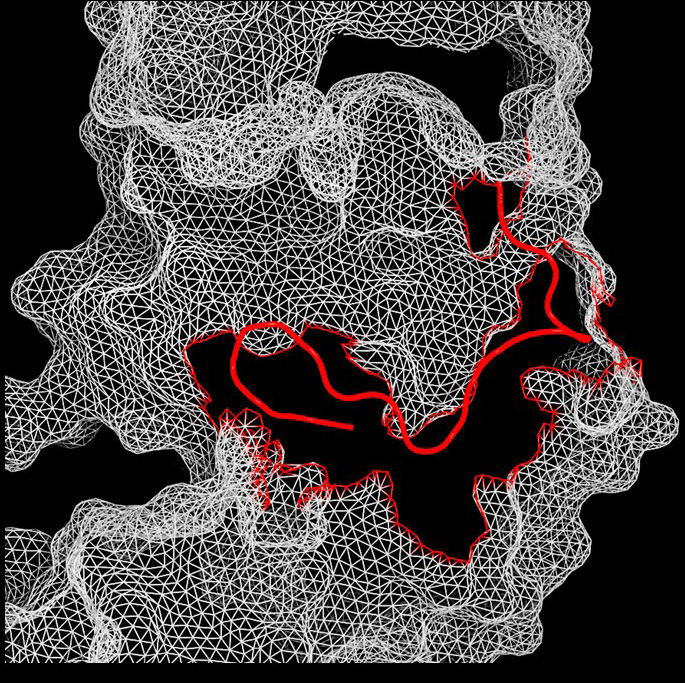
Figure 3. Closed conformation in Inactive FRFR1 kinase

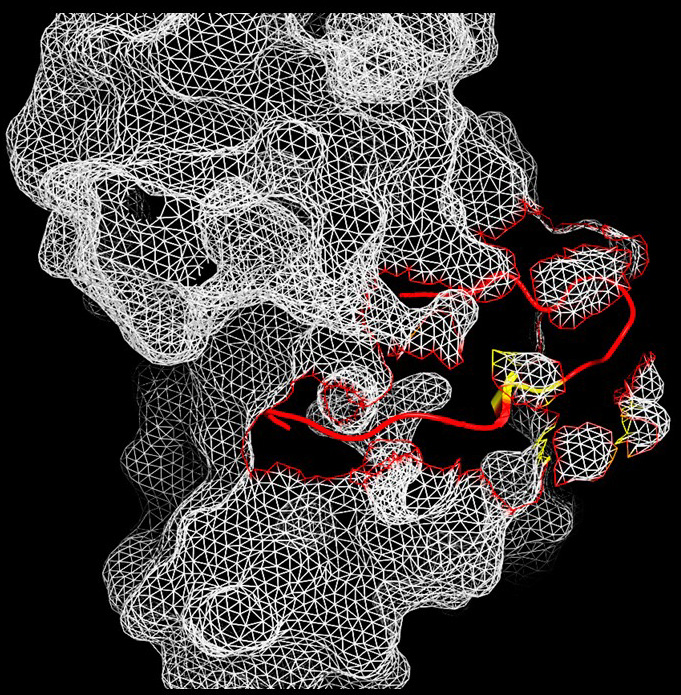
Figure 4. Open conformation in active FRFR1 kinase

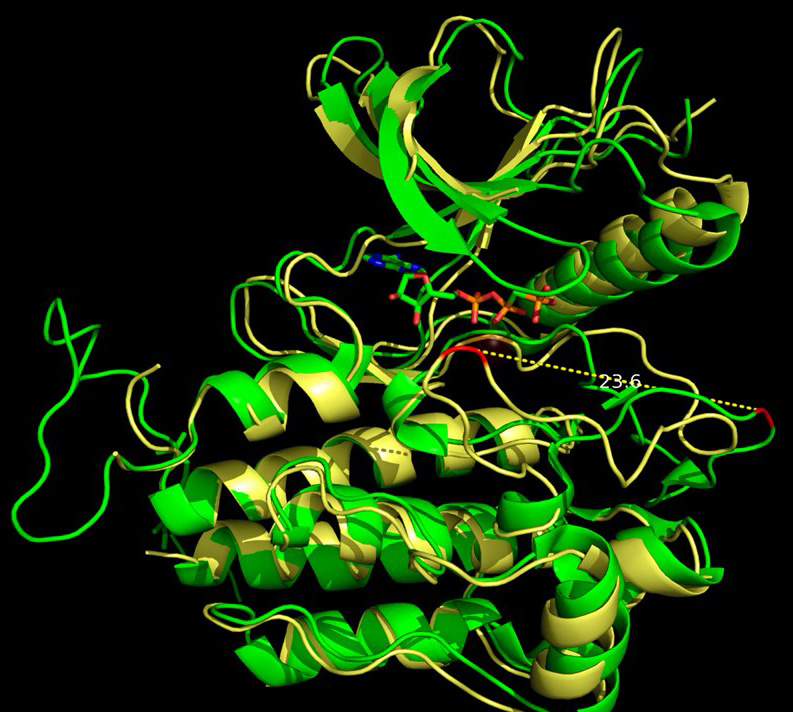
Figure 5. Overlay Structures of Active and Inactive Forms of FGFR1 kinase

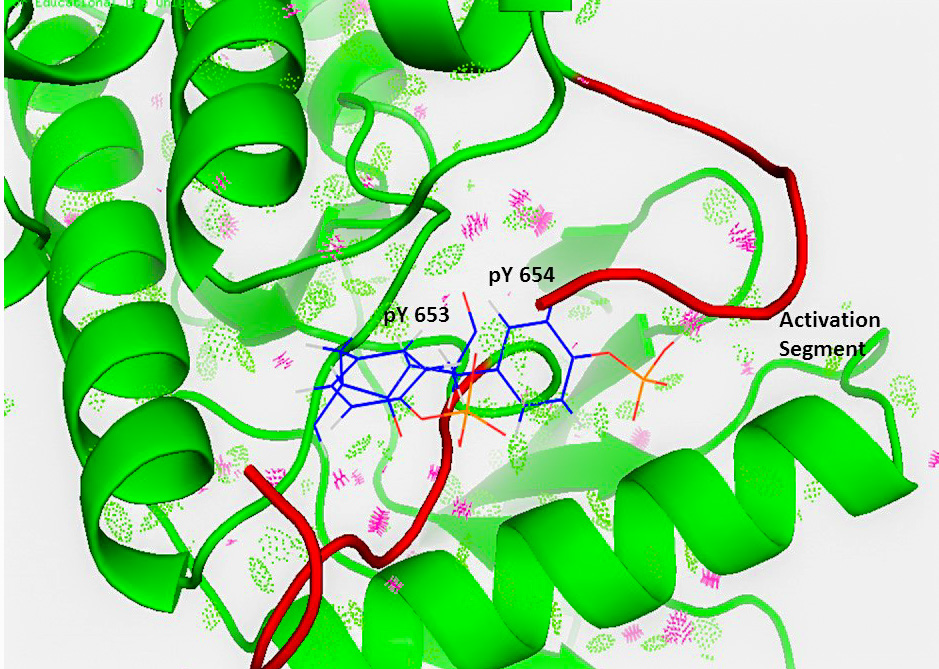
Figure 6. Dots and contacts on pY653 & pY654

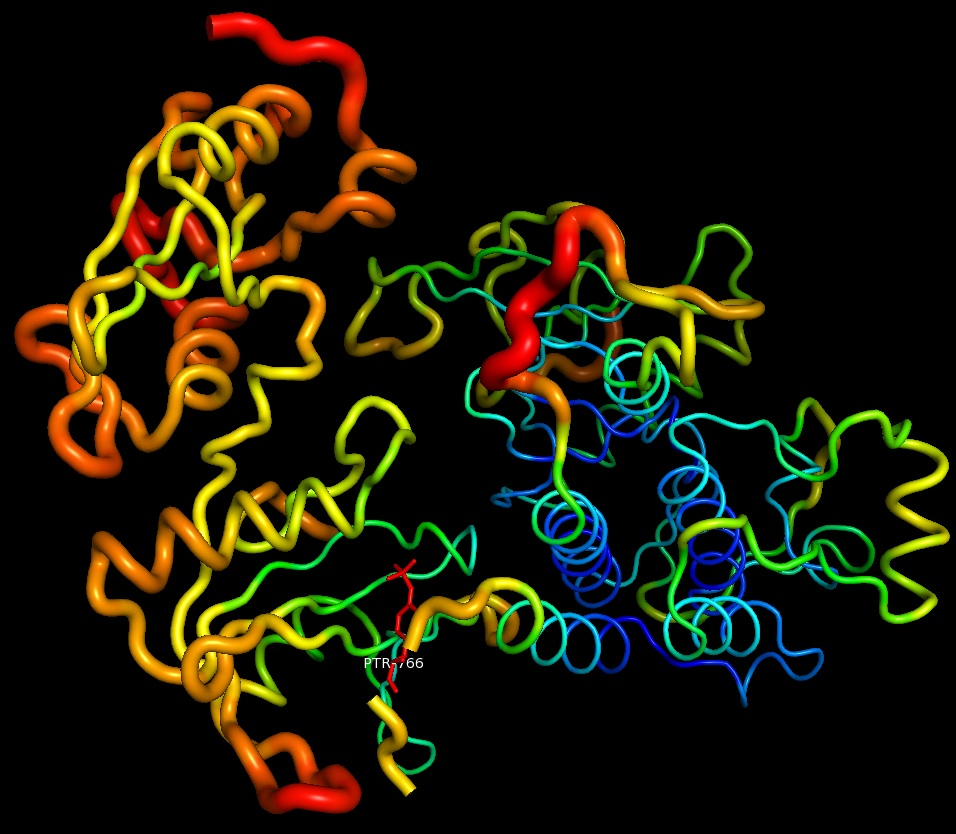
Figure 7. The β-factor of the PLC-FGFR1 kinase complex

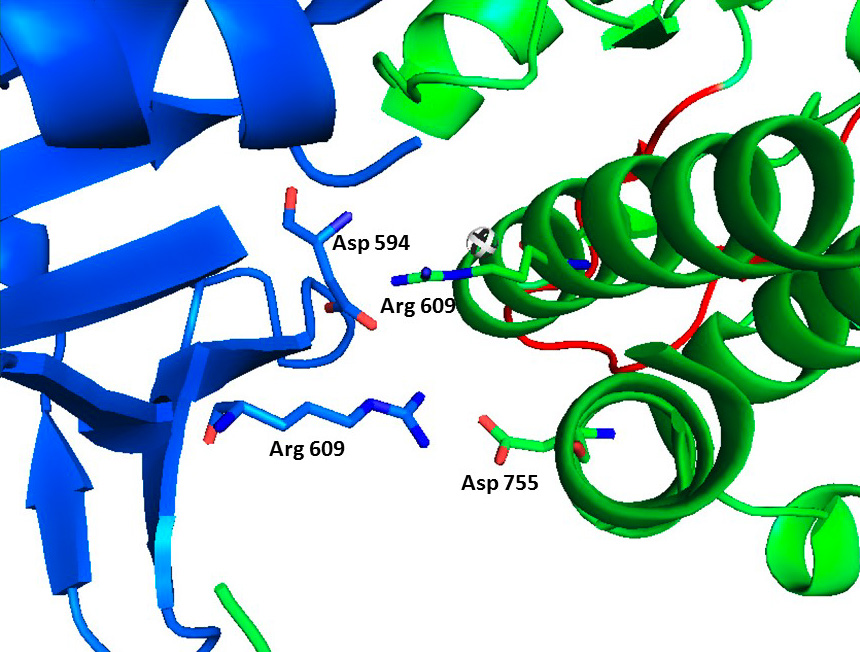
Figure 8. Interface on the N-SH2 binding site and FGFR1 kinase. The FGFR1 kinase is bound to the N-SH2 domain primarily through charged amino acids. The acid base pair (D755 and R609) located in the middle of the interface are nearly parallel to each other, indicating a highly favorable interaction.

The tyrosine kinase region of FGFR1 binds to the N-SH2 domain of PLCγ primarily through charged amino acids. Arginine residue (R609) on the N-SH2 domain forms a salt bridge to aspartate 755 (D755) on the FGFR1 domain. The acid base pairs located in the middle of the interface are nearly parallel to each other, indicating a highly favorable interaction. The N-SH2 domain makes an additional polar contact through water-mediated interaction that takes place between the N-SH2 domain and the FGFR1 kinase region. The arginine residue 609 (R609) on the FGFR1 kinase also forms a salt bridge to the aspartate residue (D594) on the N-SH2 domain. The acid-base pair interacts with each other carry out a reduction–oxidation reaction that stabilizes the complex (Figure 7). Previous studies have done to elucidate the binding affinity of the n-SH2 domain with the FGFR1 kinase complex by mutating these phenylalanine or valine amino acids. The results from isothermal titration calorimetry indicated that the binding affinity of the complex decreased by 3 to 6-fold, without affecting the phosphorylation of the tyrosine residues.

=== Cell inhibition ===
FGF-induced activation of FGFR1 also stimulates the activation of sprouty proteins SPRY1, SPRY2, SPRY3, and/or SPRY4 which in turn interact with GRB2, SOS1, and/or c-Raf to reduce or inhibit further cell stimulation by activated FGFR1 as well as other tyrosine kinase receptors such as the Epidermal growth factor receptor. These interactions serve as negative feedback loops to limit the extent of cellular activation.

== Function ==
Mice genetically engineered to lack a functional Fgfr1 gene (ortholog of the human FGFR1 gene) die in utero before 10.5 days of gestation. Embryos exhibit extensive deficiencies in the development and organization of mesoderm-derived tissues and the musculoskeletal system. The Fgfr1 gene appears critical for the truncation of embryonic structures and formation of muscle and bone tissues and thereby the normal formation of limbs, skull, outer, middle, and inner ear, neural tube, tail, and lower spine as well as normal hearing.

== Clinical significance ==
=== Congenital diseases ===
Hereditary mutations in the FGFR1 gene are associated with various congenital malformations of the musculoskeletal system. Interstitial deletions at human chromosome 8p12-p11, arginine to a stop nonsense mutation at FGFR1 amino acid 622 (annotated as R622X), and numerous other autosomal dominant inactivating mutations in FGFR1 are responsible for ~10% of the cases of Kallmann syndrome. This syndrome is a form of hypogonadotropic hypogonadism associated in a varying percentage of cases with anosmia or hyposmia; cleft palate and other craniofacial defects; and scoliosis and other musculoskeletal malformations. An activating mutation in FGFR1 viz., P232R (proline-to-arginine substitution in the protein's 232nd amino acid), is responsible for the Type 1 or classic form of Pfeiffer syndrome, a disease characterized by craniosynostosis and mid-face deformities. A tyrosine-to-cysteine substitution mutation in the 372nd amino acid of FGFR1 (Y372C) is responsible for some cases of Osteoglophonic dysplasia. This mutation results in craniosynostosis, mandibular prognathism, hypertelorism, brachydactyly, and inter-phalangeal joint fusion. Other inherited defects associated with 'FGFR1 mutations likewise involve musculoskeletal malformations: these include the Jackson–Weiss syndrome (proline to arg substitution at amino acid 252), Antley-Bixler syndrome (isoleucine-to-threonine at amino acid 300 (I300T), and trigonocephaly (mutation the same as the one for the Antley-Bixler syndrome viz., I300T).

=== Cancers ===
Somatic mutations and epigenetic changes in the expression of the FGFR1 gene occur in and are thought to contribute to various types of lung, breast, hematological, and other types of cancers.

==== Lung cancers ====
Amplification of the FGFR1 gene (four or more copies) is present in 9 to 22% of patients with non-small-cell lung carcinoma (NSCLC). FGFR1 amplification was highly correlated with a history of tobacco smoking and proved to be the single largest prognostic factor in a cohort of patients suffering this disease. About 1% of patients with other types of lung cancer show amplifications in FGFR1.

==== Breast cancers ====
Amplification of FGFR1 also occurs in ~10% of estrogen receptor positive breast cancers, particularly of the luminal subtype B form of breast cancer. The presence of FGFR1 amplification has been correlated with resistance to hormone blocking therapy and found to be a poor prognostic factor in the disease.

==== Hematological cancers ====
In certain rare hematological cancers, the fusion of FGFR1 with various other genes due to Chromosomal translocations or Interstitial deletions create genes that encode chimeric FGFR1 Fusion proteins. These proteins have continuously active FGFR1-derived tyrosine kinase and thereby continuously stimulated the cell growth and proliferation. These mutations occur in the early stages of myeloid and/or lymphoid cell lines and are the cause of or contribute to the development and progression of certain types of hematological malignancies that have increased numbers of circulating blood eosinophils, increased numbers of bone marrow eosinophils, and/or the infiltration of eosinophils into tissues. These neoplasms were initially regarded as eosinophilias, hypereosinophilias, Myeloid leukemias, myeloproliferative neoplasms, myeloid sarcomas, lymphoid leukemias, or non-Hodgkin lymphomas. Based on their association with eosinophils, unique genetic mutations, and known or potential sensitivity to tyrosine kinase inhibitor therapy, they are now being classified together as clonal eosinophilias. These mutations are described by connecting the chromosome site for the FGFR1 gene, 8p11 (i.e. human chromosome 8's short arm [i.e. p] at position 11) with another gene such as the MYO18A whose site is 17q11 (i.e human chromosome 17's long arm [i.e. q] at position 11) to yield the fusion gene annotated as t(8;17)(p11;q11). These FGFR1 mutations along with the chromosomal location of FGFR1A's partner gene and the annotation of the fused gene are given in the following table.

Gene	locus	notation	gene	locus	notation	Gene	locus	notation	gene	locus	notation	gene	locus	notation
MYO18A	17q11	t(8;17)(p11;q11)	CPSF6	12q15	t(8;12)(p11;q15)	TPR	1q25	t(1;8)(q25p11;;	HERV-K	10q13	t(8;13)(p11-q13)	FGFR1OP2	12p11	t(8;12)(p11;q12)
ZMYM2	13q12	t(8;13)(p11;q12)	CUTL1	7q22	t(7;8)(q22;p11)	SQSTM1	5q35	t(5;8)(q35;p11	RANBP2	2q13	t(2;8)(q13;p11)	LRRFIP1	2q37	t(8;2)(p11;q37)
CNTRL	9q33	t(8;9)(p11;q33)	FGFR1OP	6q27	t(6;8)(q27;p11)	BCR	22q11	t(8;22)(p11;q11	NUP98	11p15	t(8;11)(p11-p15)	MYST3	8p11.21	multiple
CEP110	16p12	t(8;16)(p11;p12)												

These cancers are sometimes termed 8p11 myeloproliferative syndromes based on the chromosomal location of the FGFR1 gene. Translocations involving ZMYM2, CNTRL, and FGFR1OP2 are the most common forms of these 8p11 syndromes. In general, patients with any of these diseases have an average age of 44 and present with fatigue, night sweats, weight loss, fever, lymphadenopathy, and enlarged liver and/or spleen. They typically evidence hematological features of the myeloproliferative syndrome with moderate to greatly elevated levels of blood and bone marrow eosinophils. However, patients bearing: a) ZMYM2-FGFR1 fusion genes often present as T-cell lymphomas with spreading to non-lymphoid tissue; b) FGFR1-BCR fusion genes usually present as chronic myelogenous leukemias; c) CEP110 fusion genes may present as a chronic myelomonocytic leukemia with involvement of tonsil; and d) FGFR1-BCR or FGFR1-MYST3 fusion genes often present with little or no eosinophilia. Diagnosis requires conventional cytogenetics using Fluorescence in situ hybridization#Variations on probes and analysis for FGFR1.

Unlike many other myeloid neoplasms with eosinophil such as those caused by Platelet-derived growth factor receptor A or platelet-derived growth factor receptor B fusion genes, the myelodysplasia syndromes caused by FGFR1 fusion genes in general do not respond to tyrosine kinase inhibitors, are aggressive and rapidly progressive, and require treatment with chemotherapy agents followed by bone marrow transplantion in order to improve survival. The tyrosine kinase inhibitor Ponatinib has been used as mono-therapy and subsequently used in combination with intensive chemotherapy to treat the myelodysplasia caused by the FGFR1-BCR fusion gene.

==== Phosphaturic mesenchymal tumor ====
Phosphaturic mesenchymal tumors is characterized by a hypervascular proliferation of apparently non-malignant spindled cells associated with a variable amount of 'smudgy' calcified matrix but a small subset of these tumors exhibit malignant histological features and may behave in a clinically malignant fashion. In a series of 15 patients with this disease, 9 were found to have tumors that bore fusions between the FGFR1 gene and the FN1 gene located on human chromosome 2 at position q35. The FGFR1-FN1 fusion gene was again identified in 16 of 39 (41%) patients with phosphaturic mesenchymal tumors. The role of the(2;8)(35;11) FGFR1-FN1 fusion gene in this disease is not known.

==== Rhabdomyosarcoma ====
Elevated expression of FGFR1 protein was detected in 10 of 10 human Rhabdomyosarcoma tumors and 4 of 4 human cell lines derived from rhabdomyosarcoma. The tumor cases included 6 cases of Alveolar rhabdomyosarcoma, 2 cases of Embryonal rhabdomyosarcoma, and 2 cases of pleomorphic rhabdomyosarcoma. Rhabdomyosarcoma is a highly malignant form of cancer that develops from immature skeletal muscle cell precursors viz., myoblasts that have failed to fully differentiate. FGFR1 activation causes myoblast to proliferate while inhibiting their differentiation, dual effects that may lead to the assumption of a malignant phenotype by these cells. The 10 human rhabdomyosarcoma tumor exhibited decreased levels of methylation of CpG islands upstream of the first FGFR1 exon. CpG islands commonly function to silence expression of adjacent genes while their methylation inhibits this silencing. Hypomethylation of CpG islands upstream of FGFR1 is hypothesized to be at least in part responsible for the over-expression of FGFR1 by and malignant behavior of these rhabdomyosarcoma tumors. In addition, a single case of rhabdomyosarcoma tumor was found express co-amplified FOXO1 gene at 13q14 and FGFR1 gene at 8p11, i.e. t(8;13)(p11;q14), suggesting the formation, amplification, and malignant activity of a chimerical FOXO1-FGFR1 fusion gene by this tumor.

==== Other types of cancers ====
Acquired abnormalities if the FGFR1 gene are found in: ~14% of urinary bladder Transitional cell carcinomas (almost all are amplifications); ~10% of squamous cell Head and neck cancers (~80% amplifications, 20% other mutations); ~7% of endometrial cancers (half amplifications, half other types of mutations); ~6% of prostate cancers (half amplifications, half other mutations); ~5% of ovarian Papillary serous cystadenocarcinoma (almost all amplifications); ~5% of colorectal cancers (~60 amplifications, 40% other mutations); ~4% of sarcomas (mostly amplifications); <3% of Glioblastomas (Fusion of FGFR1 and TACC1 (8p11) gene); <3% of Salivary gland cancer (all amplifications); and <2% in certain other cancers.

=== FGFR inhibitors ===
FGFR-targeted drugs exert direct as well as indirect anticancer effects, due to the fact that FGFRs on cancer cells and endothelial cells are involved in tumorigenesis and vasculogenesis, respectively. FGFR therapeutics are active as FGF affects numerous features of cancers, such as invasiveness, stemness and cellular survival. Primary among such drugs are antagonists. Small molecules that fit between the ATP binding pockets of the tyrosine kinase domains of the receptors. For FGFR1, numerous such small molecules have been approved for targeting the TKI ATP pocket. These include dovitinib and brivanib. The table below provides the IC50 (nanomolar) of small-molecule compounds targeting FGFRs.

PD173074	Dovitinib	Ki23057	Lenvatinib	Brivanib	Nintedanib	Ponatinib	MK-2461	Lucitanib	AZD4547
26	8	NA	46	148	69	2.2	65	18	0.2

FGFR1 mutation in breast and lung cancer as a result of genetic over-amplification is effectively targeted using dovitinib and ponatinib, respectively. Drug resistance is a highly relevant topic in the field of drug development for FGFR targets. FGFR inhibitors allow for the increase of tumor sensitivity to cytotoxic anticancer drugs such as paclitaxel, and etoposide in human cancer cells, thereby decreasing antiapoptotic potential based on faulty FGFR activation. Since FGF signaling inhibition dramatically reduces revascularization, it interferes with one of the hallmarks of cancers, angiogenesis. It also reduces tumor burden in human tumors that depend on autocrine FGF signaling, based on FGF2 upregulation following the common VEGFR-2 therapy for breast cancer. Thus, FGFR1 can act synergistically with therapies to cut off cancer clonal resurgence by eliminating potential pathways of future relapse. Moreover, FGF signaling inhibition dramatically reduces revascularization.

FGFR inhibitors have been predicted to be effective on relapsed tumors because of the clonal evolution of an FGFR-activated minor subpopulation after therapy targeted to EGFRs or VEGFRs. Because there are multiple mechanisms of action for FGFR inhibitors to overcome drug resistance in human cancer, FGFR-targeted therapy might be a promising strategy for the treatment of refractory cancer.

AZD4547 has undergone a phase II clinical trial in gastric cancer and reported some results.

Lucitanib is an inhibitor of FGFR1 and FGFR2 and has undergone clinical trials for advanced solid tumors.

Dovitinib (TKI258), an inhibitor of FGFR1, FGFR2, and FGFR3, has had a clinical trial on FGFR-amplified breast cancers.

=== FGFR agonists ===
In addition to endogenous ligands, synthetic small-molecule agonists have been developed to selectively activate FGFR1 signaling for cell culture applications. Molecules such as TCB-32, TCB-541, and TCB-621 have been utilized as stable alternatives to recombinant proteins for the maintenance of pluripotent stem cells.

== Interactions ==
Fibroblast growth factor receptor 1 has been shown to interact with:

- FGF1,
- FRS2,
- Klotho,
- GRB14, and
- SHB.

== See also ==
- Cluster of differentiation
