= Pseudoautosomal region =

Region of sexual chromosomes exhibiting an autosomal inheritance pattern

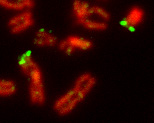
Detail of a human metaphase spread. A region in the pseudoautosomal region of the short arms of the X chromosome (left) and the Y chromosome (top right) was detected by fluorescent in situ hybridization (green). Chromosomes counterstained in red.

The pseudoautosomal regions or PARs are homologous sequences of nucleotides found within the sex chromosomes of species with an XY or ZW mechanism of sex determination.

The pseudoautosomal regions get their name because any genes within them (so far at least 29 have been found for humans) are inherited just like any autosomal genes. In humans, these regions are referred to as PAR1 and PAR2. PAR1 comprises 2.6 Mbp of the short-arm tips of both X and Y chromosomes in humans and great apes (X and Y are 154 Mbp and 62 Mbp in total). PAR2 is at the tips of the long arms, spanning 320 kbp. The monotremes, including the platypus and echidna, have a multiple sex chromosome system, and consequently have 8 pseudoautosomal regions.

== Location ==
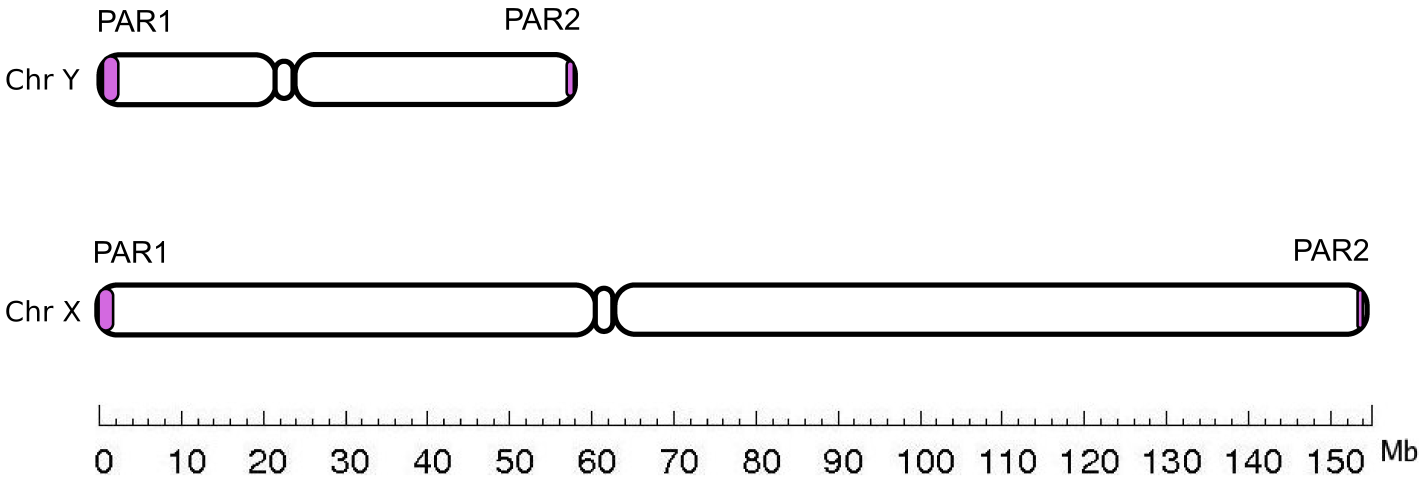
Pseudoautosomal regions are at both termini of the sex chromosomes.

The locations of the PARs within GRCh38 are:

Name	Chromosome	Basepair start	Basepair stop	Band
PAR1	X	10,001	2,781,479	Xp22
PAR1	Y	10,001	2,781,479	Yp11
PAR2	X	155,701,383	156,030,895	Xq28
PAR2	Y	56,887,903	57,217,415	Yq12

The locations of the PARs within GRCh37 are:

Name	Chromosome	Basepair start	Basepair stop
PAR1	X	60,001	2,699,520
PAR1	Y	10,001	2,649,520
PAR2	X	154,931,044	155,260,560
PAR2	Y	59,034,050	59,363,566

== Inheritance and function ==
Normal male therian mammals have two copies of these genes: one in the pseudoautosomal region of their Y chromosome, the other in the corresponding portion of their X chromosome. Normal females also possess two copies of pseudoautosomal genes, as each of their two X chromosomes contains a pseudoautosomal region. Crossing over between the X and Y chromosomes is normally restricted to the pseudoautosomal regions; thus, pseudoautosomal genes exhibit an autosomal, rather than sex-linked, pattern of inheritance. So, females can inherit an allele originally present on the Y chromosome of their father.

The function of these pseudoautosomal regions is that they allow the X and Y chromosomes to pair and properly segregate during meiosis in males.

== Genes ==
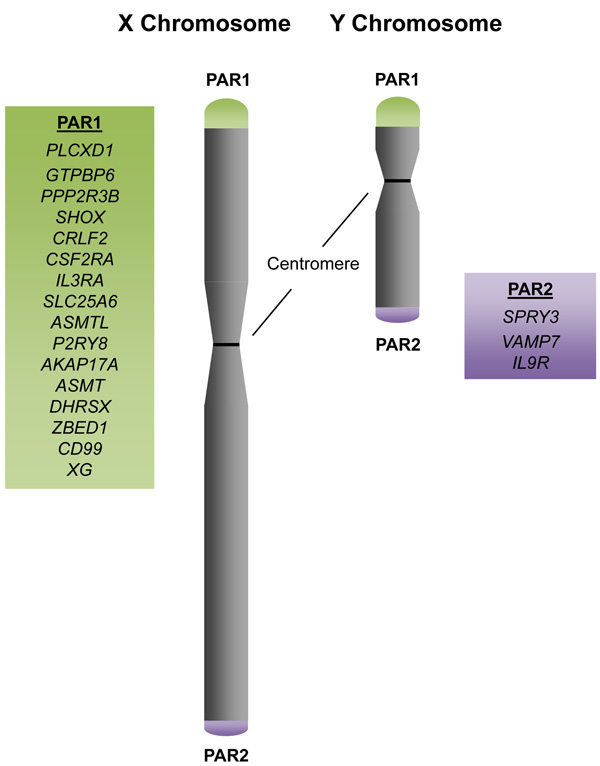
PAR1 contains 16 genes, with PLCXD1 as the furthermost PAR1 gene at the distal telomeric end and XG at the boundary of PAR1 at the centromeric end. PAR2 contains 3 genes, with SPRY3 at the centromeric boundary and IL9R at the distal telomeric end.

Pseudoautosomal genes are found in two different locations: PAR1 and PAR2. These are believed to have evolved independently.

=== PAR1 ===
- pseudoautosomal PAR1
  - AKAP17A
  - ASMT
  - ASMTL
  - CD99
  - CRLF2
  - CSF2RA
  - DHRSX
  - GTPBP6
  - IL3RA
  - P2RY8
  - PLCXD1
  - PPP2R3B
  - SHOX
  - SLC25A6
  - XG, which straddles the PAR1 region boundary
  - ZBED1

in mice, some PAR1 genes have transferred to autosomes.

=== PAR2 ===
- pseudoautosomal PAR2
  - IL9R
  - SPRY3
  - VAMP7, also known as SYBL1
  - CXYorf1, also known as FAM39A and now mapped to the pseudogene WASH6P, but of interest due to its proximity to the telomere.

== Pathology ==
Pairing (synapsis) of the X and Y chromosomes and crossing over (recombination) between their pseudoautosomal regions appear to be necessary for the normal progression of male meiosis. Thus, those cells in which X-Y recombination does not occur will fail to complete meiosis. Structural and/or genetic dissimilarity (due to hybridization or mutation) between the pseudoautosomal regions of the X and Y chromosomes can disrupt pairing and recombination, and consequently cause male infertility.

The SHOX gene in the PAR1 region is the gene most commonly associated with and well understood with regards to disorders in humans,.

Deletions have also been associated with Léri-Weill dyschondrosteosis and Madelung's deformity.

== See also ==
- Interleukin-3 receptor
- Interleukin-9 receptor
