= MYO18A =

Protein-coding gene in the species Homo sapiens

Identifiers
- Aliases: MYO18A, MYSPDZ, SPR210, myosin XVIIIA, MAJN, SP-R210
- External IDs: OMIM: 610067; MGI: 2667185; GeneCards: MYO18A

Gene location (Human)
Chr.	Chromosome 17 (human)
Band	17q11.2	Start	29,071,122 bp
Band	17q11.2	End	29,180,398 bp

Gene location (Mouse)
Chr.	Chromosome 11 (mouse)
Band	11|11 B5	Start	77,763,246 bp
Band	11|11 B5	End	77,865,980 bp
RNA expression pattern
Bgee	Human / Mouse (ortholog); Top expressed in: gastrocnemius muscle; skeletal muscle tissue; apex of heart; muscle of thigh; sural nerve; right auricle of heart; left ventricle; corpus callosum; right lobe of liver; epithelium of colon / Top expressed in: muscle of thigh; esophagus; lip; triceps brachii muscle; ankle; right ventricle; temporal muscle; skeletal muscle tissue; intestinal villus; neural layer of retina; More reference expression data
BioGPS	n/a
Gene ontology
Molecular function	DNA binding; nucleotide binding; ADP binding; actin filament binding; ATPase activity; protein binding; ATP binding; RNA binding
Cellular component	cytoplasm; membrane; trans-Golgi network; actomyosin; cytoskeleton; myosin complex; endoplasmic reticulum-Golgi intermediate compartment; Golgi membrane; Golgi apparatus; cell surface
Biological process	Golgi organization; Golgi vesicle budding; actomyosin structure organization; DNA metabolic process; asymmetric Golgi ribbon formation; negative regulation of apoptotic process; positive regulation of protein secretion; cell migration; Golgi ribbon formation; regulation of macrophage activation; positive regulation of opsonization
Sources:Amigo / QuickGO
Orthologs
Databases	NCBI: entry; OMA: entry
Species	Human	Mouse
Entrez	399687	360013
Ensembl	ENSG00000196535	ENSMUSG00000000631
UniProt	Q92614	Q9JMH9
RefSeq (mRNA)	NM_001346765; NM_001346766; NM_001346767; NM_001346768; NM_078471 NM_203318	NM_001291212; NM_001291213; NM_001291214; NM_001291215; NM_011586
RefSeq (protein)	NP_001333694; NP_001333695; NP_001333696; NP_001333697; NP_510880 NP_976063	NP_001278141; NP_001278142; NP_001278143; NP_001278144; NP_035716
Location (UCSC)	Chr 17: 29.07 – 29.18 Mb	Chr 11: 77.76 – 77.87 Mb
PubMed search
- Wikidata
View/Edit Human	View/Edit Mouse

MYO18A is a large unconventional myosin protein encoded in humans by the MYO18A gene. Unlike classical myosins that are involved in muscle contraction, unconventional myosins serve a variety of functions in non-muscle cells, such that include cargo transport, cytoskeletal regulation, membrane dynamics, and signaling. MYO18A is distinguished from other myosins by the presence of a unique amino-terminal PDZ domain, extensive coiled-coil regions, and an alternative myosin motor-like domain that lacks functional ATPase activity. Across various studies, this protein has appeared under multiple names related to function, including myosin containing a PDZ domain (MYSPDZ), Molecule Associated with JAK3 N-terminus (MAJN), TGFB1-induced anti-apoptotic factor 1 (TIAF1), surfactant protein receptor SP-R210. These alternative names reflect the array of biological contexts in which MYO18A has been studied, ranging from immune cell signaling to surfactant protein receptor biology in the lung.

MYO18A is ubiquitously expressed and participates in key structural and regulatory processes including Golgi morphology, actin cytoskeletal organization, vesicle trafficking, innate immune receptor regulation, and pathogen clearance. Although structurally similar to a myosin motor protein, current biochemical evidence suggests that MYO18A may act as primarily as a scaffolding protein that cooperates with actin-binding factors, kinases, and membrane associated adaptors to coordinate intricate cellular behaviors.

== Structure ==
The human MYO18A protein is composed of 2,054 amino acids, and exhibits a modular constitution common to unconventional myosins. The amino-terminal region contains a PDZ domain that spans across residues ~220-311.PDZ domains typically mediate protein-protein interactions, and in MYO18A this region has been associated with binding membrane-associated partners, regulatory proteins, and components of the Golgi apparatus. Upstream of the PDZ domain, MYO18A contains a short actin-interacting motif across residues 114-118 and a larger amino-terminal segment spanning from residues 1-398 that is capable of nucleotide-independent binding to F-actin.

AlphaFold structural predictions for MYO18A show ordered domains corresponding to the PDZ and motor-like regions, interspersed with substantial intrinsically disordered segments. The full-length predicted structure has an average pLDDT score around 70, indicating moderate overall confidence but highly reliable domain scorers. However, there is no experimentally determined three-dimensional structure currently available in the Protein Data Bank for MYO18A.

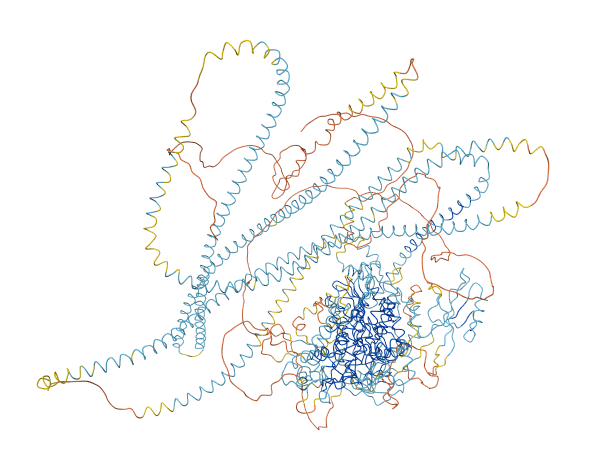
AlphaFold predicted structure for Myosin-XVIIIa, 70.69 average pLDDT

== Isoforms ==
Post translational modifications including alternative and combinatorial splicing of the MYO18A gene can generate multiple protein isoforms with distinct amino- and carboxy-terminal extensions, localizations within cells, and functional properties.The core domain architecture, which consists of a myosin motor-like domain, an IQ motif, and a coiled-coil region, is conserved across isoforms, and all known isoforms lack intrinsic ATPase activity and do not perform ATP-dependent motor functions.

Three isoforms, validated through experimentation: MYO18Aα, MYO18Aβ, and MYO18Aγ, have been described. MYO18Aα and MYO18Aβ share a common carboxy-terminal extension but differ from each other at the amino-terminus: MYO18Aα contains a KE-rich region and a PDZ domain, whereas MYO18Aβ lacks both of these features. MYO18Aγ contains unique proline-rich and serine-rich amino- and carboxy- terminal sequences and is selectively expressed in cardiac and skeletal muscle.

Two additional isoforms, predicted by computational analyses, are MYO18Aδ and MYO18Aε, which contain the serine-rich carboxy-terminal extension but differ by the presence or absence of the amino-terminal KE/PDZ region. A deeper layer of variety arises from the addition or removal of internal small exons that generate numerous isoform variants with small peptide insertions.

MYO18A isoforms display tissue-specific expression patterns: MYO18Aα variants occur broadly in somatic and mature immune cells, MYO18Aβ is enriched in myeloid and natural killer cells, and MYO18Aγ is restricted to striated muscle cells. Several forms expressed on macrophage and NK-cell surfaces make up the SP-R210 receptor for surfactant protein A (SP-A), reflecting an additional layer of specialization in isoform function.

== Functions ==
Although the myosin motor-like domain of MYO18A binds to ATP and ADP, the protein lacks intrinsic ATPase activity and shows no evidence of conventional actin-based motor function. Rather, MYO18A acts primarily as an actin-binding and scaffolding protein. The motor-like region exhibits its highest affinity for actin when in the ADP-bound state and it contributes to ADP-dependent tethering of actin filaments, providing structural rather than mechanical function within actomyosin assemblies.

MYO18A contributes to the organization of the Golgi apparatus as well as vesicle trafficking through its interaction with GOLPH3, a PI4P-binding protein associated with the trans-Golgi network. This interaction links Golgi membranes to actin filaments of the cytoskeleton, and the interaction has been proposed to generate or transmit tensile forces required for vesicle budding and maintenance of Golgi morphology. Through this association with GOLPH3 and the actin cytoskeleton, MYO18A aids in Golgi-to-plasma membrane trafficking and may participate in stress-dependent Golgi reorientation.

Additionally, MYO18A also plays an important role in cell migration and actomyosin dynamics. This protein forms a tripartite complex with the scaffold protein LURAP1 and the myotonic dystrophy kinase-related CDC42-binding kinase (MRCK), components of a signaling pathway involved in regulating lamellar actomyosin retrograde flow. Retrograde flow is crucial for organizing the leading edge of migrating cells, controlling membrane protrusion, and establishing front-to-rear polarity. This interaction between LURAP1 and MYO18A takes place in the PDZ region of MYO18Aα.

MYO18A also contributes to cell migration and actin remodeling through its association with the βPIX-PAK2 signaling module. MYO18Aα binds to the guanine nucleotide exchange factor βPIX through its carboxyl-terminal extension, allowing for the recruitment of PAK2, a kinase that regulates actin dynamics, focal adhesion turnover, and membrane ruffling. Normally, βPIX and PAK2 form a complex with G-protein-coupled receptor kinase interaction 1 (GIT1), which localizes to focal adhesions and orchestrates lamellipodial actin assembly during motile behavior. In cerebellar Purkinje neurons, MYO18Aα helps target βPIX to dendritic spines, where it contributes to normal spine maturation through the coordinated assembly of actin and myosin filaments. MYO18A appears to take a role as a versatile cross-linker.

MYO18A plays a major role in cytoskeletal organization through its interaction with nonmuscle myosin II-A (MYH9). The MYO18Aα isoform binds actin at two distinct sites: one within the motor-like domain with highest affinity in the ADP-bound state, the other within the ATP-insensitive KE-rich region of the amino-terminus. These actin-binding behaviors, together with its affinity for MYH9, MYO18A acts as a regulator of actomyosin architecture instead of the usual ATP-driven motor. MYO18A coassembles with MYH9 to form heterotypic bipolar filaments, which reveals that the two functions cooperate within contractile actin networks. MYH9 is a generator of mechanical force needed for cell migration, adhesion, cytokinesis, and stress-fiber dynamics, and the incorporation of MYO18A into bipolar filaments can modulate their physical properties. This has been seen when MYO18Aβ coassembles with MYH9 in macrophages, filament size is reduced due to the beta isoform missing the amino-terminal actin-binding region.

The cooperative interaction of MYO18A and MYH9 may be involved in the localization of MYO18A binding partners to actin filaments through cytoskeleton signaling modifiers. These modifiers, such as LURAP1, βPIX, GOLPH3, and p190GEF, target RhoGTPases RAC1, RAC2, and CDC42 along with their effector kinases PAK1 and PAK2. Through these signaling pathways, MYO18A aids in coordinating actomyosin remodeling, lateral intercellular interactions, and mechanical coupling between the cytoskeleton and extracellular matrix.

MYO18A plays a central role in innate immune function through its expression on the surface of macrophages as the surfactant protein A receptor SP-R210, with two major isoforms: the long form SP-R210L (MYO18Aα) and the short form SP-R210S (MYO18Aβ). Originally, the isoforms were identified as a 210kDa receptor for surfactant protein A (SP-A), but was later shown to be MYO18A itself. SP-R210 isoforms mediate opsonic phagocytosis of SP-A bound pathogens and coordinate inflammatory cytokine secretion during microbial challenge. MYO18Aα is expressed in terminally differentiated macrophages, such as alveolar macrophages or RAW264.7 cells, while MYO18Aβ is more broadly distributed in bone-marrow-derived macrophages, monocyte-derived macrophages, and peritoneal macrophages. MYO18Aβ mediates attachment of alveolar macrophages to Staphylococcus aureus while MYO18Aα handles internalization and clearance of the microbe. MYO18A-dependent SP-A signaling further contributes to macrophage cytokine production, responses to viral infection, and lung immune homeostasis.

MYO18A also participates in cytokine-mediated immune responses. SP-A binding to SP-R210 modulates the lung's defense against helminth infection through crosstalk with IL-4 receptor signaling and PI3K-Akt pathways, promoting proliferation of alternatively activated (M2) macrophages in the lung. Alternatively, ligation of complement component C1q to MYO18A isoforms can enhance fibrosis and inflammatory signaling in peritoneal macrophages, highlighting the context-dependent nature of MYO18A-mediated immune responses. With regards to mycobacterial infection, SP-A-MYO18A interactions increased secretion of inflammatory mediators and reactive oxygen intermediates, though MYO18A can also suppress Th1 lymphocyte responses depending on immune context.

Dysregulation of MYO18A isoform expression dramatically changes the activation of macrophages. Dominant-negative disruption of MYO18Aα in RAW264.7 cells results in a hyper-inflammatory phenotype distinguished by increased expression of innate immune receptors (scavenger receptor class A, CD36, TLR-2, CD14, CD11b, CD11c) as well as increased secretion of cytokines TNF-α and IFNβ in response to TLR ligands or influenza infection. Genomic studies showed that losing either or both MYO18A isoforms leads to widespread changes in transcriptional programs, implicating MYO18A in control of chromatin accessibility. Depletion of MYO18Aα results in PU.1-dependent heterochromatin reduction and increased transcription of macrophage-associated genes. SP-A itself modulated MYO18Aα expression in a paracrine manner, indicating reciprocal regulation between ligand and receptor. These findings show that MYO18A integrates membrane-level pathogen recognition with nuclear mechanisms of macrophage activation.

The surface molecule CD245, previously an orphan antigen on human peripheral blood lymphocytes was identified as MYO18A. MYO18A is expressed on NK cells, T cells, and B cells, and is recruited to the NK-cell surface during activation. Engagement of MYO18A enhances NK-cell cytotoxicity and promotes killing of target cells expressing CD137 ligand. This activation requires downstream signaling through PAK2 and SHP-2, aligning with kinase pathways known to regulate NK-cell degranulation and antitumor immunity.

In the adaptive immune system, MYO18A has been reported to enhance natural killer (NK) cell cytotoxicity and activation. MYO18A is expressed on the surface of NK cells as CD245, where it participates in activation pathways that promote degranulation and target-cell killing. MYO18A isoforms are also present in B cells and may influence B-cell receptor signaling and differentiation, although these roles remain less extensively explored in comparison to its functions in macrophages and NK cells. In B cells, MYO18Aα associates with ezrin and tyrosine phosphorylated proteins following antigen receptor stimulation. Studies in mice demonstrated that MYO18A functions as a regulatory checkpoint in B-cell development, activation, and humoral immunity, limiting excessive B-cell proliferation and antibody secretion. Together, the activities of MYO18A in NK-cells, T-cells, and B-cells establish it as a multifunctional regulator of lymphoid immunity, bridging membrane signaling, cytoskeletal remodeling, and effector responses across innate and adaptive immune populations.

== Interactions ==
MYO18A interacts with several cytoskeletal, signaling, and membrane-associated proteins, including:

- GOLPH3
- MYH9
- LURAP1
- CDC42BPA/CDC42BPB (MRCKα/β)
- βPIX/PAK2
- SP-A/C1q
- CD14
- GIT1
- Ezrin

== Clinical significance ==
MYO18A has been shown to be involved the process of viral invasion. Knockdown of MYO18A increases intracellular and extracellular infectivity of hepatitis C virus (HCV). It has been found to move from the cell membrane to the viral assembly complex of human cytomegalovirus during late infection. Additionally, MYO18A may play a role in influenza virus A infection (IVA), as IAV co-opts SP-A to evade host defenses by alveolar macrophages. SP-R210L and SP-R210S isoforms are differentially involved in endolysosomal sorting and TLR7 sensing of IAV that results in either abortive or restrictive infection through a mechanism of RAC GTPase recruitment of interferon-inducible transmembrane transcription factor (IFITM3).

MYO18A is often associated with cancer biology when it is part of gene fusions of the MYO18Aα PDZ domain with several genes (FGFR1, PDGFRB, MLL, FLT3, ALK). These fusions have been identified in multiple myeloid and hematologic cancers. The PDZ domain interacts with the phosphoinositide lipid phosphatase (PTEN), suggesting a role in phosphoinositide metabolism. PTEN modulates chromatin using PU.1 in hematopoietic progenitor cells, but it also plays complex roles in immune cell leukemias as well as in somatic cancers as a tumor suppressor. The depletion of SP-R210L changes the PU.1 chromatin and epigenome landscape of RAW264.7 macrophages.
