= Clovis Oncology =

American pharmaceutical company

- Company type: Public
- Traded as: Nasdaq: CLVS; Russell 2000 Component
- Industry: Pharmaceutical
- Founded: April 2009; 15 years ago in Boulder, Colorado
- Founder: Patrick Mahaffy
- Headquarters: Boulder, Colorado, U.S.
- Revenue: ▲$165 Million(2020)
- Number of employees: 429

Clovis Oncology is an American pharmaceutical company which mainly markets products for treatment in oncology. Clovis was founded in 2009 and is headquartered in Boulder, Colorado. The company is a publicly traded company on NASDAQ under the symbol CLVS and is in the NASDAQ Biotechnology Index with several products in its product pipeline. As of December 31, 2017, the company was not profitable and had incurred losses in each year since its inception in April 2009. In December 2022, Clovis Oncology filed for Chapter 11 bankruptcy.

== History ==
Clovis Oncology was founded in 2009 by Patrick Mahaffy in Boulder, Colorado. The company was named in honor of the Mahaffy cache, a collection of Clovis period stone tools dated to 11,000 BCE, discovered in the front yard of Mahaffy's home in Boulder.

== Product development ==
=== Rociletinib ===
The company was developing rociletinib, as a treatment for non-small cell lung cancer. A phase III trial was completed in April 2016 and had it been approved it would have competed with AstraZeneca's Tagrisso (osimertinib). According to the company web site as of November 2016 studies on the drug are no longer accepting new patients, but Clovis would continue to supply the drug to patients whose physicians had recommended continued treatment.

In September 2018, the company and two former executives agreed to a $20 million settlement with the Securities and Exchange Commission on claims it exaggerated to investors the efficacy of Roci in patient trials.

=== Rucaparib ===
Rucaparib is a PARP inhibitor in Phase II and III clinical trials for advanced ovarian cancer. In December 2016, the Food and Drug Administration granted an accelerated approval for the use of rucaparib "for the treatment of patients with deleterious BRCA mutation (germline and/or somatic)-associated advanced ovarian cancer who have been treated with two or more chemotherapies". In 2023, rucaparib was sold to Pharmaand GmbH (Pharma&) as part of Clovis's bankruptcy proceedings.

=== Lucitanib ===
Lucitanib is a VEGFR inhibitor. It is also an inhibitor of FGFR1 and FGFR2 and has undergone clinical trials for advanced solid tumors.
