= FGFR1OP =

Protein-coding gene in humans

CEP43
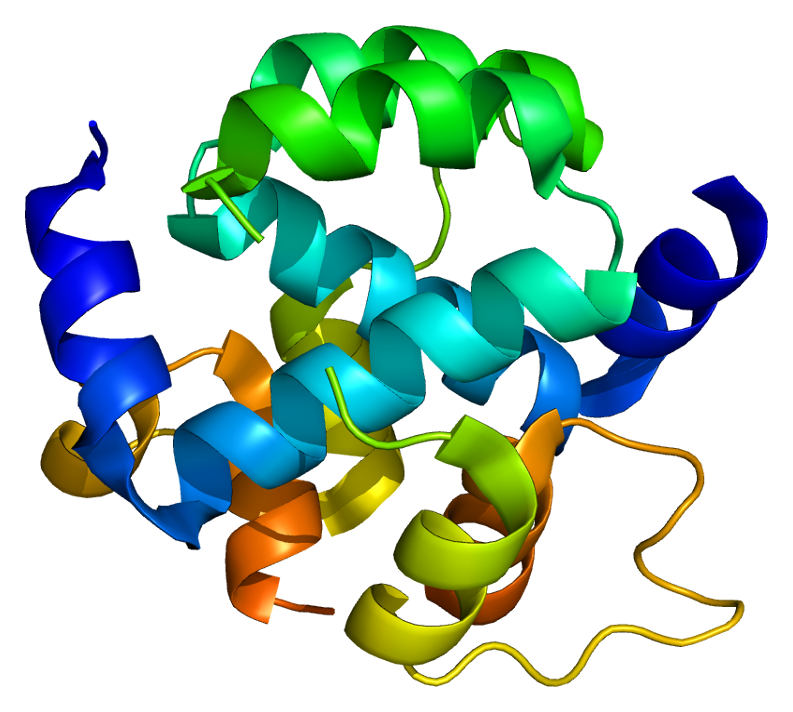

Identifiers
- Aliases: CEP43, FOP, FGFR1 oncogene partner, centrosomal protein 43, FGFR1OP
- External IDs: OMIM: 605392; MGI: 1922546; GeneCards: CEP43
Available structures
| PDB | Ortholog search: PDBe RCSB |
| PDB | List of PDB id codes 2D68 |

Gene location (Human)
| Chr. | Chromosome 6 (human) |
| Band | 6q27 | Start | 166,999,317 bp |
| Band | 6q27 | End | 167,094,789 bp |

Gene location (Mouse)
| Chr. | Chromosome 17 (mouse) |
| Band | 17|17 A1 | Start | 8,384,333 bp |
| Band | 17|17 A1 | End | 8,415,636 bp |
RNA expression pattern
| Bgee | Human / Mouse (ortholog); Top expressed in: sperm; secondary oocyte; tendon of biceps brachii; right uterine tube; left testis; right testis; buccal mucosa cell; endometrium; internal globus pallidus; bronchial epithelial cell / Top expressed in: otic vesicle; hand; otolith organ; utricle; spermatocyte; primitive streak; Paneth cell; hair follicle; mandibular prominence; maxillary prominence; More reference expression data |
| BioGPS | n/a |
Gene ontology
| Molecular function | protein homodimerization activity; protein tyrosine kinase inhibitor activity; protein binding; protein tyrosine kinase activity; protein kinase binding |
| Cellular component | cytoplasm; cytosol; centrosome; microtubule organizing center; perinuclear region of cytoplasm; cytoskeleton; nucleus; centriole; cell projection |
| Biological process | negative regulation of protein kinase activity; positive regulation of cell migration; positive regulation of cell growth; microtubule anchoring; G2/M transition of mitotic cell cycle; positive regulation of cell population proliferation; peptidyl-tyrosine phosphorylation; negative regulation of protein tyrosine kinase activity; ciliary basal body-plasma membrane docking; regulation of G2/M transition of mitotic cell cycle; cell projection organization |
Sources:Amigo / QuickGO
Orthologs
| Databases | NCBI: entry; OMA: entry |
| Species | Human | Mouse |
| Entrez | 11116 | 75296 |
| Ensembl | ENSG00000213066 | ENSMUSG00000069135 |
| UniProt | O95684 | Q66JX5 |
| RefSeq (mRNA) | NM_194429; NM_001278690; NM_007045 | NM_001197046; NM_201230 |
| RefSeq (protein) | NP_001265619; NP_008976; NP_919410 | NP_001183975; NP_957682 |
| Location (UCSC) | Chr 6: 167 – 167.09 Mb | Chr 17: 8.38 – 8.42 Mb |
| PubMed search |
- Wikidata
| View/Edit Human | View/Edit Mouse |

FGFR1 oncogene partner is a protein that in humans is encoded by the CEP43 gene (also called FGFR1OP).

== Function ==
This gene encodes a largely hydrophilic protein postulated to be a leucine-rich protein family member. A t(6;8)(q27;p11) chromosomal translocation, fusing this gene and the fibroblast growth factor receptor 1 (FGFR1) gene, has been found in cases of myeloproliferative disorder. The resulting chimeric protein contains the N-terminal leucine-rich region of this encoded protein fused to the catalytic domain of FGFR1. This gene is thought to play an important role in normal proliferation and differentiation of the erythroid lineage. Alternatively spliced transcript variants that encode different proteins have been identified.
