= SPRY4 =

Protein-coding gene in the species Homo sapiens

Available structures
PDB	Ortholog search: PDBe RCSB
PDB	List of PDB id codes 3BUN

Identifiers
- Aliases: SPRY4, HH17, sprouty RTK signaling antagonist 4
- External IDs: OMIM: 607984; MGI: 1345144; HomoloGene: 8042; GeneCards: SPRY4; OMA:SPRY4 - orthologs

Gene location (Human)
Chr.	Chromosome 5 (human)
Band	5q31.3	Start	142,310,427 bp
Band	5q31.3	End	142,326,455 bp

Gene location (Mouse)
Chr.	Chromosome 18 (mouse)
Band	18 B3|18 20.5 cM	Start	38,719,300 bp
Band	18 B3|18 20.5 cM	End	38,734,468 bp
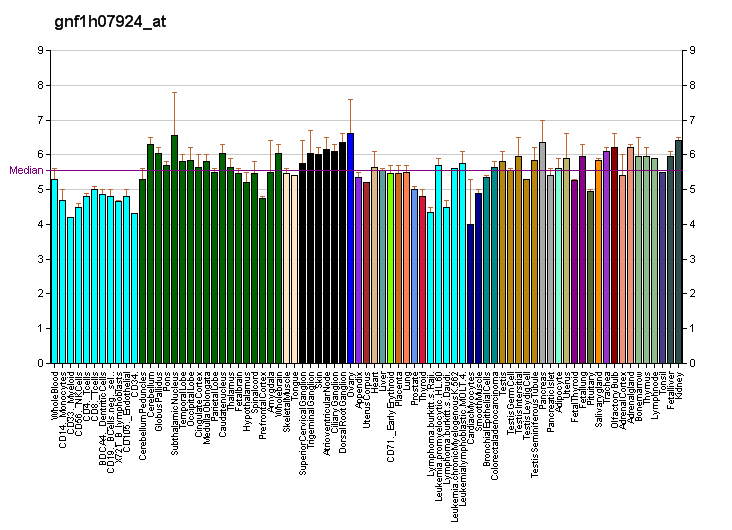

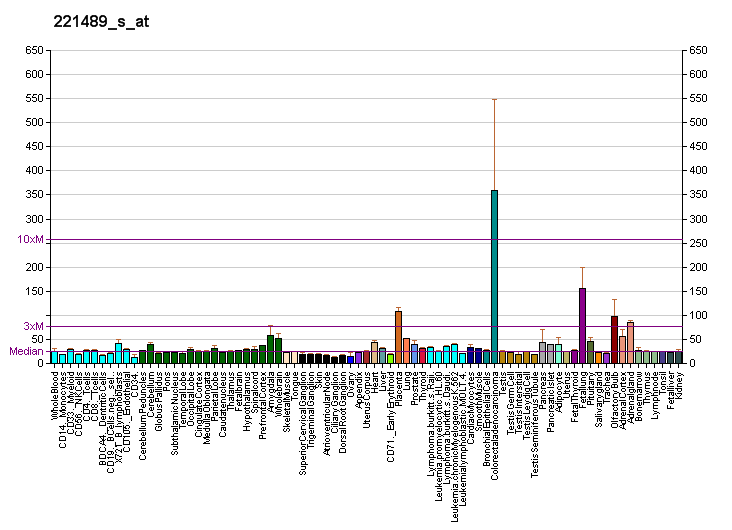
RNA expression pattern
Bgee	Human / Mouse (ortholog); Top expressed in: left coronary artery; right lung; ascending aorta; upper lobe of left lung; Descending thoracic aorta; cartilage tissue; right coronary artery; lower lobe of lung; tibial arteries; left adrenal gland / Top expressed in: secondary oocyte; primary oocyte; tail of embryo; zygote; left lung lobe; lumbar spinal ganglion; entorhinal cortex; perirhinal cortex; Ileal epithelium; nasolacrimal duct; More reference expression data
BioGPS	More reference expression data
Gene ontology
Molecular function	protein binding
Cellular component	ruffle membrane; plasma membrane; cell projection; membrane; focal adhesion; cytoplasm; cytosol
Biological process	multicellular organism development; negative regulation of ERK1 and ERK2 cascade; regulation of signal transduction; negative regulation of fibroblast growth factor receptor signaling pathway; negative regulation of MAP kinase activity; negative regulation of Ras protein signal transduction
Sources:Amigo / QuickGO
Orthologs
Species	Human	Mouse
Entrez	81848	24066
Ensembl	ENSG00000187678	ENSMUSG00000024427
UniProt	Q9C004	Q9WTP2
RefSeq (mRNA)	NM_001127496; NM_001293289; NM_001293290; NM_030964	NM_011898
RefSeq (protein)	NP_001120968; NP_001280218; NP_001280219; NP_112226	NP_036028
Location (UCSC)	Chr 5: 142.31 – 142.33 Mb	Chr 18: 38.72 – 38.73 Mb
PubMed search
- Wikidata
View/Edit Human	View/Edit Mouse

Protein sprouty homolog 4 is a protein that in humans is encoded by the SPRY4 gene.

== Function ==
SPRY4 is an inhibitor of the receptor-transduced mitogen-activated protein kinase (MAPK) signaling pathway. It is positioned upstream of RAS (see HRAS; MIM 190020) activation and impairs the formation of active GTP-RAS (Leeksma et al., 2002).

== Interactions ==
SPRY4 has been shown to interact with TESK1.

== See also ==
- MAPK signaling pathway
- Ras subfamily
