= Rociletinib =

Cancelled developmental cancer drug

Clinical data
- Trade names: Xegafri
- Other names: CO-1686, AVL-301
- Routes of administration: By mouth
- ATC code: L01EB05 (WHO)

Identifiers
- IUPAC name: N-(3-{[2-{[4-(4-Acetyl-1-piperazinyl)-2-methoxyphenyl]amino}-5-(trifluoromethyl)-4-pyrimidinyl]amino}phenyl)acrylamide
- CAS Number: 1374640-70-6
- PubChem CID: 57335384
- DrugBank: DB11907
- ChemSpider: 30646712
- UNII: 72AH61702G
- KEGG: D10858
- CompTox Dashboard (EPA): DTXSID801025958

Chemical and physical data
- Formula: C_{27}H_{28}F_{3}N_{7}O_{3}
- Molar mass: 555.562 g·mol^{−1}
- 3D model (JSmol): Interactive image
- SMILES: CC(=O)N1CCN(CC1)c2ccc(c(c2)OC)Nc3ncc(c(n3)Nc4cccc(c4)NC(=O)C=C)C(F)(F)F
- InChI: InChI=1S/C27H28F3N7O3/c1-4-24(39)32-18-6-5-7-19(14-18)33-25-21(27(28,29)30)16-31-26(35-25)34-22-9-8-20(15-23(22)40-3)37-12-10-36(11-13-37)17(2)38/h4-9,14-16H,1,10-13H2,2-3H3,(H,32,39)(H2,31,33,34,35); Key:HUFOZJXAKZVRNJ-UHFFFAOYSA-N

Rociletinib is a medication developed to treat non-small cell lung carcinomas with a specific mutation. It is a third-generation epidermal growth factor receptor tyrosine kinase inhibitor. It was being developed by Clovis Oncology as a potential treatment for non-small-cell lung cancer. In May 2016, development of rociletinib was halted, along with its associated clinical trials, and Clovis Oncology withdrew its marketing authorisation application from the European Medicines Agency.
