= Brivanib alaninate =

Chemical compound

Clinical data
- Routes of administration: Oral
- ATC code: none

Legal status
- Legal status: US: Investigational New Drug

Identifiers
- IUPAC name: (S)-(R)-1-((4-((4-fluoro-2-methyl-1H-indol-5-yl)oxy)-5-methylpyrrolo[2,1-f][1,2,4]triazin-6-yl)oxy)propan-2-yl 2-aminopropanoate
- CAS Number: 649735-63-7
- PubChem CID: 11154925
- IUPHAR/BPS: 8097
- ChemSpider: 9330033
- UNII: U2Y5OFN795
- ChEBI: CHEBI:167656
- ChEMBL: ChEMBL270995
- CompTox Dashboard (EPA): DTXSID20215295
- ECHA InfoCard: 100.167.334

Chemical and physical data
- Formula: C_{22}H_{24}FN_{5}O_{4}
- Molar mass: 441.463 g·mol^{−1}
- 3D model (JSmol): Interactive image
- SMILES: CC1=CC2=C(N1)C=CC(=C2F)OC3=NC=NN4C3=C(C(=C4)OCC(C)OC(=O)C(C)N)C
- InChI: InChI=1S/C22H24FN5O4/c1-11-7-15-16(27-11)5-6-17(19(15)23)32-21-20-13(3)18(8-28(20)26-10-25-21)30-9-12(2)31-22(29)14(4)24/h5-8,10,12,14,27H,9,24H2,1-4H3/t12-,14+/m1/s1; Key:LTEJRLHKIYCEOX-OCCSQVGLSA-N

Brivanib alaninate (INN/USAN) also known as BMS-582664 is an investigational, anti-tumorigenic drug for oral administration. The drug is being developed by Bristol-Myers Squibb for the treatment of hepatocellular carcinoma or HCC (also called malignant hepatoma), the most common type of liver cancer. Brivanib is no longer in active development.

Brivanib alaninate is a multitargeted tyrosine kinase inhibitor (as is sorafenib).

Brivanib alaninate also inhibits VEGFR and fibroblast growth factor receptors (FGFR), which is known to play a major role in the etiopathogenesis of HCC. To date, brivanib alaninate has been investigated in 29 studies, including more than 4,000 patients around the world.

== Hepatocellular carcinoma (summary) ==
Hepatocellular carcinoma is a primary cancer of the liver and is more common in men than in women. The disease occurs mostly in people who have scarring of the liver (cirrhosis) or after infection with hepatitis B or hepatitis C. Symptoms include pain and swelling in the abdomen, weight loss, weakness, loss of appetite, and nausea. Hepatocellular carcinoma is a severe and life-threatening disease that is associated with poor overall survival. While the choice of treatment depends mainly on how advanced the disease is, the only proven therapies to cure the cancer are either surgical removal of the tumors or remove and replace the liver via transplantation, but these therapies can only be carried out in very few patients. Other treatments include chemotherapy and immunotherapy. Radiofrequency ablation and ethanol injection are also used to remove small tumors.

As a result of poor liver function, metastases, or both, only 10% to 20% of patients undergo surgery. In patients having surgery, the 5-year survival rate is only 25% to 50%. Several chemotherapeutic agents have been evaluated for the treatment of hepatocellular carcinoma. Doxorubicin (trade name Adriamycin; also known as hydroxydaunorubicin), the most widely used agent in HCC, has shown a 4% to 10.5% response rate in patients with HCC. Studies have shown that the overall response (OR) rate, but not overall survival (OS), doubles when doxorubicin was given in combination with cisplatin, IFN, and 5-fluorouracil. The multi-targeted tyrosine kinase inhibitor sorafenib (trade name Nexavar), which inhibits vascular endothelial growth factor receptor (VEGFR), platelet-derived growth factor receptor, raf, c-kit, and flt-3, has been shown to inhibit HCC-induced proliferation and angiogenesis. Sorafenib has also been shown to provide a significant improvement in OS in patients with HCC. Based on these results, researchers concluded that this class of agents may be effective in the treatment of HCC.

== Biological activity ==
Brivanib is the alanine ester of a VEGFR-2 inhibitor BMS-540215 and is hydrolyzed to the active moiety BMS-540215 in vivo. BMS-540215, a dual tyrosine kinase inhibitor, shows potent and selective inhibition of VEGFR and fibroblast growth factor receptor (FGFR) tyrosine kinases.

BMS-540215 is an ATP-competitive inhibitor of human VEGFR-2, with an IC_{50} of 25 nmol/L and K_{i} of 26 nmol/L. In addition, it inhibits VEGFR-1 (IC_{50} = 380 nmol/L) and VEGFR-3 (IC_{50} = 10 nmol/L). BMS-540215 also showed good selectivity for FGFR-1 (IC_{50} = 148 nmol/L), FGFR-2 (IC_{50} = 125 nmol/L), and FGFR-3 (IC_{50} = 68 nmol/L). Furthermore, BMS-540215 has been shown to selectively inhibit the proliferation of endothelial cells stimulated by VEGF and FGF in vitro with IC_{50} values of 40 and 276 nmol/L, respectively. It also shows broad-spectrum in vivo antitumor activity over multiple dose levels and induces stasis in large tumors, suggesting that it may have a role in the treatment of hepatocellular carcinoma (HCC).

== Pharmacokinetic and pharmacodynamic profiles ==
=== Mechanisms of action ===
The exact mechanisms by which brivanib treatment induces growth inhibition are not well understood. Ongoing research has shown that brivanib affects the host endothelium based on both in vitro and in vivo effects). Brivanib may prevent the tumor mass from expanding by cutting off the supply of nutrients and growth factors to the tumor cells.

A recent study showed that brivanib effectively inhibits tumor growth and that brivanib-induced growth inhibition is associated with inactivation of VEGFR-2, increased apoptosis, a reduction in microvessel density, inhibition of cell proliferation, and down-regulation of cell cycle regulators, including cyclin D1, Cdk-2, Cdk-4, cyclin B1, and phospho-c-Myc. Based on this study, researchers have concluded that cell cycle arrest due to a reduction in positive cell cycle regulators may be responsible for the observed growth inhibition. The same study showed that treatment with brivanib also led to a decrease in the number of proliferating cells compared with control.

== Ongoing clinical development ==
While a phase II trial for hepatocellular carcinoma showed an acceptable safety profile and results indicating efficacy against HCC, four subsequent phase III trials found no increased survival and increased rates of adverse effects when compared with sorafenib or placebo.

== Regulatory status ==
On 27 October 2011, orphan designation (EU/3/11/918) was granted by the European Commission to Bristol-Myers Squibb for brivanib alaninate for the treatment of hepatocellular carcinoma. At the time of the orphan designation, several medicines were authorized in the EU for the treatment of hepatocellular carcinoma.
