= PI-PLC X domain-containing protein 1 =

Protein-coding gene in the species Homo sapiens

PLCXD1

Identifiers
- Aliases: PLCXD1, LL0XNC01-136G2.1, phosphatidylinositol specific phospholipase C X domain containing 1
- External IDs: OMIM: 300974; MGI: 2685422; HomoloGene: 41259; GeneCards: PLCXD1; OMA:PLCXD1 - orthologs

Gene location (Human)
Chr.	X chromosome (human)
Band	X;Y	Start	276,322 bp
Band	X;Y	End	303,356 bp

Gene location (Mouse)
Chr.	Chromosome 5 (mouse)
Band	5|5 F	Start	110,247,835 bp
Band	5|5 F	End	110,253,819 bp
RNA expression pattern
Bgee	Human / Mouse (ortholog); Top expressed in: ventricular zone; right hemisphere of cerebellum; embryo; ganglionic eminence; mucosa of sigmoid colon; tibia; skin of arm; skin of thigh; Region I of hippocampus proper; epithelium of colon / Top expressed in: lumbar subsegment of spinal cord; substantia nigra; lip; esophagus; dorsal striatum; epiblast; superior frontal gyrus; nucleus accumbens; skin of external ear; primitive streak; More reference expression data
BioGPS	n/a
Gene ontology
Molecular function	phosphoric diester hydrolase activity
Cellular component	cytoplasm
Biological process	lipid metabolism
Sources:Amigo / QuickGO
Orthologs
Species	Human	Mouse
Entrez	55344	403178
Ensembl	ENSG00000182378	ENSMUSG00000064247
UniProt	Q9NUJ7	Q8CHS4
RefSeq (mRNA)	NM_018390; NM_001370370; NM_001370371; NM_001370372; NM_001370373	NM_001281812; NM_207279
RefSeq (protein)	NP_060860; NP_001357299; NP_001357300; NP_001357301; NP_001357302	n/a
Location (UCSC)	Chr X: 0.28 – 0.3 Mb	Chr 5: 110.25 – 110.25 Mb
PubMed search
- Wikidata
View/Edit Human	View/Edit Mouse

PI-PLC X domain-containing protein 1, also known as Phosphatidylinositol-specific phospholipase C, X domain containing 1, is an enzyme which in humans is encoded by the PLCXD1 gene. The gene coding for this protein is located in the pseudoautosomal region 1 (PAR1) of X and Y chromosomes.
