= TESK1 =

Protein-coding gene in the species Homo sapiens

Identifiers
- Aliases: TESK1, testis-specific kinase 1, testis associated actin remodelling kinase 1
- External IDs: OMIM: 601782; MGI: 1201675; GeneCards: TESK1
Enzyme activity
EC #	BRENDA	ExPASy	KEGG	MetaCyc
2.7.12.1	↗	↗	↗	↗

Gene location (Human)
Chr.	Chromosome 9 (human)
Band	9p13.3	Start	35,605,235 bp
Band	9p13.3	End	35,610,328 bp

Gene location (Mouse)
Chr.	Chromosome 4 (mouse)
Band	4|4 A5	Start	43,441,939 bp
Band	4|4 A5	End	43,448,064 bp
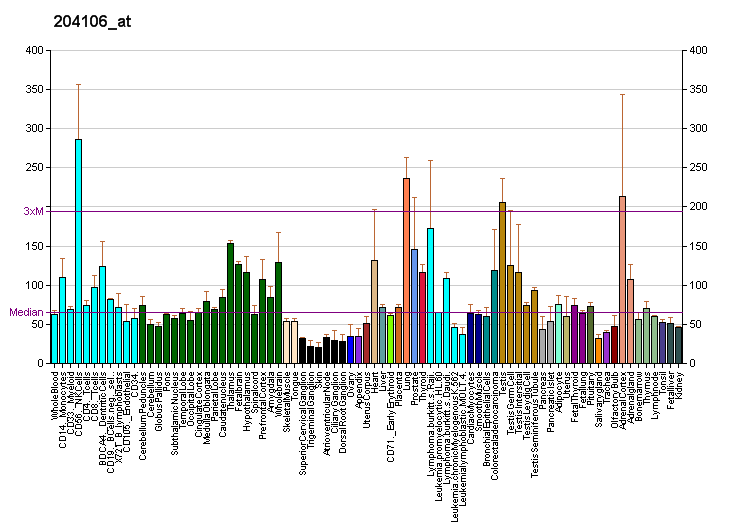
RNA expression pattern
Bgee	Human / Mouse (ortholog); Top expressed in: left coronary artery; right coronary artery; ascending aorta; anterior pituitary; gastrocnemius muscle; gastric mucosa; canal of the cervix; left lobe of thyroid gland; body of stomach; subcutaneous adipose tissue / Top expressed in: seminiferous tubule; spermatid; spermatocyte; superior frontal gyrus; muscle of thigh; primary visual cortex; dentate gyrus of hippocampal formation granule cell; internal carotid artery; right kidney; entorhinal cortex; More reference expression data
BioGPS	More reference expression data
Gene ontology
Molecular function	transferase activity; nucleotide binding; protein serine/threonine/tyrosine kinase activity; protein tyrosine kinase activity; protein kinase activity; protein binding; ATP binding; metal ion binding; kinase activity; protein serine/threonine kinase activity; signal transducer activity; protein C-terminus binding; protein kinase binding
Cellular component	cytosol; cytoplasm; nucleus; cytoplasmic vesicle
Biological process	peptidyl-tyrosine phosphorylation; spermatogenesis; phosphorylation; intracellular signal transduction; protein phosphorylation; actin cytoskeleton organization; negative regulation of protein autophosphorylation; regulation of protein localization; positive regulation of stress fiber assembly; negative regulation of protein serine/threonine kinase activity
Sources:Amigo / QuickGO
Orthologs
Databases	NCBI: entry
Species	Human	Mouse
Entrez	7016	21754
Ensembl	n/a	ENSMUSG00000028458
UniProt	Q15569	O70146
RefSeq (mRNA)	NM_006285; NM_001318230	NM_011571
RefSeq (protein)	NP_001305159; NP_006276	NP_035701
Location (UCSC)	Chr 9: 35.61 – 35.61 Mb	Chr 4: 43.44 – 43.45 Mb
PubMed search
- Wikidata
View/Edit Human	View/Edit Mouse

Dual specificity testis-specific protein kinase 1 is an enzyme that in humans is encoded by the TESK1 gene.

== Function ==
This gene product is a serine/threonine protein kinase that contains an N-terminal protein kinase domain and a C-terminal proline-rich domain. Its protein kinase domain is most closely related to those of the LIM motif-containing protein kinases (LIMKs). The encoded protein can phosphorylate myelin basic protein and histone in vitro. The testicular germ cell-specific expression and developmental pattern of expression of the mouse gene suggests that this gene plays an important role at and after the meiotic phase of spermatogenesis.

== Interactions ==
TESK1 has been shown to interact with YWHAB and SPRY4.
