= SPRY3 =

Protein-coding gene in the species Homo sapiens

Identifiers
- Aliases: SPRY3, Hspry-3, Gm1409, Gm391, sprouty3, Spry3, sprouty RTK signaling antagonist 3
- External IDs: OMIM: 300531; MGI: 1345188; HomoloGene: 4265; GeneCards: SPRY3; OMA:SPRY3 - orthologs
RNA expression pattern
Bgee	Human / Mouse (ortholog); Top expressed in: ganglionic eminence; bone marrow cells; prefrontal cortex; gastrocnemius muscle; stromal cell of endometrium; left adrenal gland; smooth muscle tissue; deltoid muscle; monocyte; ascending aorta / n/a; More reference expression data
BioGPS	n/a
Gene ontology
Molecular function	molecular function
Cellular component	cytoplasm; membrane; cytosol
Biological process	regulation of signal transduction; axon development; multicellular organism development; negative regulation of fibroblast growth factor receptor signaling pathway; negative regulation of MAP kinase activity; negative regulation of Ras protein signal transduction
Sources:Amigo / QuickGO
Orthologs
Species	Human	Mouse
Entrez	10251	236576
Ensembl	n/a	ENSMUSG00000061654
UniProt	O43610	Q3UUD2
RefSeq (mRNA)	NM_001304990; NM_005840; NM_001394353; NM_001394354; NM_001394355	NM_001030293
RefSeq (protein)	NP_001291919; NP_005831	NP_001025464; NP_001388778; NP_001388779; NP_001388780
Location (UCSC)	n/a	n/a
PubMed search
- Wikidata
View/Edit Human	View/Edit Mouse

Protein sprouty homolog 3 is a protein that in humans is encoded by the SPRY3 gene.

The SPRY3 gene is one of the genes found in the pseudoautosomal regions of the human sex chromosomes (i.e. those 19 genes that are found on both the X and Y chromosome). It is located in the PAR2 region.
