= FRS2 =

Protein-coding gene in humans

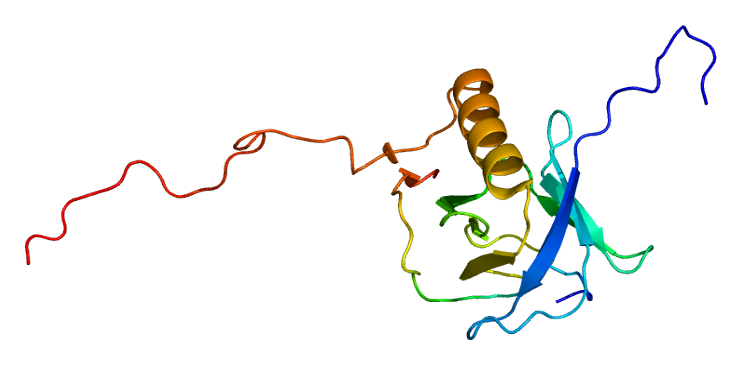
Available structures
PDB	Ortholog search: PDBe RCSB
PDB	List of PDB id codes 1XR0, 2MFQ

Identifiers
- Aliases: FRS2, FRS2A, FRS2alpha, SNT, SNT-1, SNT1, FRS1A, fibroblast growth factor receptor substrate 2
- External IDs: OMIM: 607743; MGI: 1100860; HomoloGene: 4846; GeneCards: FRS2; OMA:FRS2 - orthologs

Gene location (Human)
Chr.	Chromosome 12 (human)
Band	12q15	Start	69,470,349 bp
Band	12q15	End	69,579,793 bp
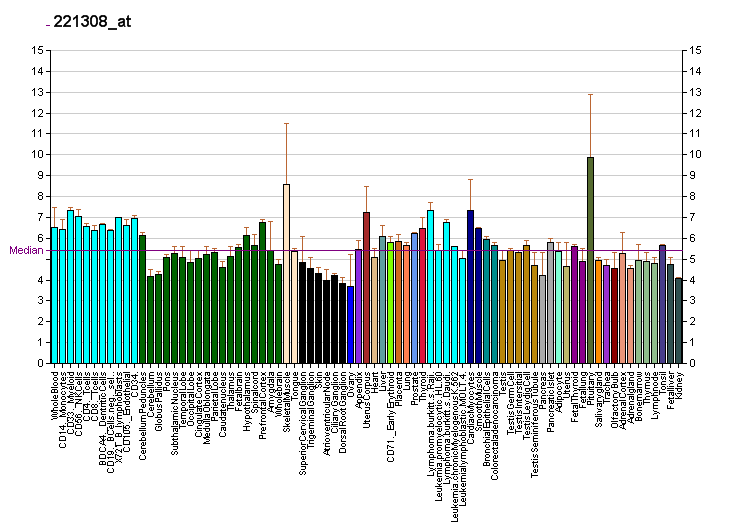
RNA expression pattern
Bgee	Human / Mouse (ortholog); Top expressed in: Achilles tendon; endothelial cell; ventricular zone; testicle; epithelium of colon; gonad; ganglionic eminence; islet of Langerhans; stromal cell of endometrium; C1 segment / n/a; More reference expression data
BioGPS	More reference expression data
Gene ontology
Molecular function	transmembrane receptor protein tyrosine kinase adaptor activity; fibroblast growth factor receptor binding; neurotrophin TRKA receptor binding; protein binding; phosphatase activator activity; 1-phosphatidylinositol-3-kinase activity; phosphatidylinositol-4,5-bisphosphate 3-kinase activity
Cellular component	cytoplasm; endosome; membrane; plasma membrane; integral component of plasma membrane; endomembrane system; cell-cell junction; cytosol
Biological process	regulation of apoptotic process; G protein-coupled receptor signaling pathway; ventricular septum development; organ induction; transmembrane receptor protein tyrosine kinase signaling pathway; gastrulation with mouth forming second; MAPK cascade; lens placode formation involved in camera-type eye formation; fibroblast growth factor receptor signaling pathway; transmembrane receptor protein tyrosine phosphatase signaling pathway; lens development in camera-type eye; prostate epithelial cord arborization involved in prostate glandular acinus morphogenesis; regulation of ERK1 and ERK2 cascade; neuroblast proliferation; forebrain development; regulation of epithelial cell proliferation; anterior/posterior axis specification, embryo; lens fiber cell development; phosphatidylinositol phosphate biosynthetic process; phosphatidylinositol-3-phosphate biosynthetic process; axon guidance; negative regulation of cardiac muscle cell differentiation; positive regulation of protein kinase B signaling; neurotrophin TRK receptor signaling pathway
Sources:Amigo / QuickGO
Orthologs
Species	Human	Mouse
Entrez	10818	327826
Ensembl	ENSG00000166225	ENSMUSG00000020170
UniProt	Q8WU20	Q8C180
RefSeq (mRNA)	NM_006654; NM_001042555; NM_001278351; NM_001278353; NM_001278354 NM_001278355; NM_001278356; NM_001278357	NM_177798
RefSeq (protein)	NP_001036020; NP_001265280; NP_001265282; NP_001265283; NP_001265284 NP_001265285; NP_001265286; NP_006645	NP_808466; NP_001395211; NP_001395212; NP_001395213; NP_001395214 NP_001395215; NP_001395216; NP_001395217; NP_001395218; NP_001395219; NP_001395220; NP_001395221; NP_001395222; NP_001395223; NP_001395224; NP_001395225; NP_001395226; NP_001395237; NP_001395238; NP_001395239; NP_001395240; NP_001395241; NP_001395242; NP_001395243
Location (UCSC)	Chr 12: 69.47 – 69.58 Mb	n/a
PubMed search
- Wikidata
View/Edit Human	View/Edit Mouse

Fibroblast growth factor receptor substrate 2 is a protein that in humans is encoded by the FRS2 gene.

FRS2 is an 80 kDa membrane-anchored signal transducing adaptor protein (STAP) that links specific activated Receptor Tyrosine Kinases (RTKs) to multiple downstream signaling pathways, most notably the MAPK/ERK, PI3K/AKT/mTOR and PLCγ pathways. It is overexpressed and amplified in several cancer types, including prostate cancer.

== Interactions ==
FRS2 has been shown to interact with:

- CBL
- FGFR1
- GRB2
- PRKCI
- PTPN11
- SOS1
- TrkA
- ALK
