= GTPBP6 =

Protein-coding gene in humans

Identifiers
- Aliases: GTPBP6, PGPL, GTP binding protein 6 (putative)
- External IDs: OMIM: 300124; MGI: 1306825; HomoloGene: 8157; GeneCards: GTPBP6; OMA:GTPBP6 - orthologs

Gene location (Human)
Chr.	X chromosome (human)
Band	X;Y	Start	304,529 bp
Band	X;Y	End	318,819 bp

Gene location (Mouse)
Chr.	Chromosome 5 (mouse)
Band	5|5 F	Start	110,251,841 bp
Band	5|5 F	End	110,256,063 bp
RNA expression pattern
Bgee	Human / Mouse (ortholog); Top expressed in: left ovary; right ovary; right hemisphere of cerebellum; tibial nerve; body of stomach; gastrocnemius muscle; body of uterus; sural nerve; left uterine tube; right uterine tube / Top expressed in: neural layer of retina; yolk sac; superior frontal gyrus; primary visual cortex; granulocyte; dentate gyrus of hippocampal formation granule cell; lip; ventricular zone; spinal ganglia; muscle of thigh; More reference expression data
BioGPS	n/a
Orthologs
Species	Human	Mouse
Entrez	8225	107999
Ensembl	ENSG00000178605	ENSMUSG00000033434
UniProt	O43824	Q3U6U5
RefSeq (mRNA)	NM_012227	NM_145147
RefSeq (protein)	NP_036359	NP_660129
Location (UCSC)	Chr X: 0.3 – 0.32 Mb	Chr 5: 110.25 – 110.26 Mb
PubMed search
- Wikidata
View/Edit Human	View/Edit Mouse

GTP binding protein 6 also known as GTPBP6 is a protein which in humans is encoded by the pseudoautosomal GTPBP6 gene.

== Clinical significance ==
Overexpression of GTPBP6 as a result of Klinefelter's syndrome (one or more extra X-chromosomes) is inversely correlated with verbal ability.
