= ZBED1 =

Protein-coding gene in the species Homo sapiens

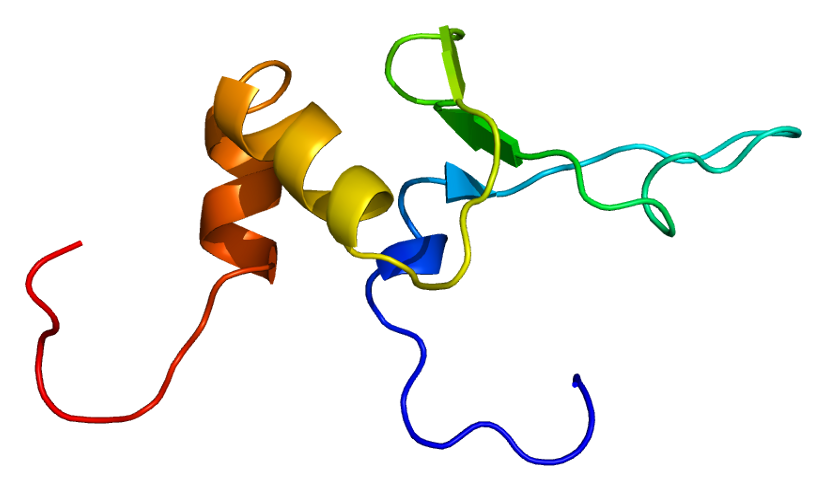

Identifiers
- Aliases: ZBED1, ALTE, DREF, TRAMP, hDREF, zinc finger BED-type containing 1
- External IDs: OMIM: 300178; GeneCards: ZBED1
Available structures
PDB	Human UniProt search: PDBe RCSB
PDB	List of PDB id codes 2CT5

Gene location (Human)
Chr.	X chromosome (human)
Band	X;Y	Start	2,486,414 bp
Band	X;Y	End	2,500,976 bp
RNA expression pattern
Bgee	Human / Mouse (ortholog); Top expressed in: glutes; gastrocnemius muscle; quadriceps femoris muscle; vastus lateralis muscle; ganglionic eminence; skin of thigh; ventricular zone; skeletal muscle tissue; muscle of arm; biceps brachii / n/a; More reference expression data
BioGPS	n/a
Gene ontology
Molecular function	DNA binding; transposase activity; protein binding; protein dimerization activity; metal ion binding; RNA polymerase II transcription regulatory region sequence-specific DNA binding; DNA-binding transcription factor activity; identical protein binding; SUMO transferase activity; RNA polymerase II cis-regulatory region sequence-specific DNA binding; DNA-binding transcription activator activity, RNA polymerase II-specific; sequence-specific DNA binding; DNA-binding transcription factor activity, RNA polymerase II-specific
Cellular component	nuclear chromosome; nucleus; nucleoplasm
Biological process	regulation of transcription by RNA polymerase II; protein sumoylation; transcription by RNA polymerase II; positive regulation of transcription by RNA polymerase II
Sources:Amigo / QuickGO
Orthologs
Databases	NCBI: entry; OMA: entry
Species	Human	Mouse
Entrez	9189	n/a
Ensembl	ENSG00000214717	n/a
UniProt	O96006	n/a
RefSeq (mRNA)	NM_004729; NM_001171135; NM_001171136	n/a
RefSeq (protein)	NP_001164606; NP_001164607; NP_004720	n/a
Location (UCSC)	Chr X: 2.49 – 2.5 Mb	n/a
PubMed search		n/a
- Wikidata
View/Edit Human

Full Name: Zinc finger BED domain-containing protein 1 is a protein that in humans is encoded by the ZBED1 gene.

ZBED1 regulates the expression of several genes involved in cell proliferation, color remodeling, protein metabolism, and other genes involved in cell proliferation and differentiation.

At one point in time ZBED1 was confused to be a gene similar to Ac transposable elements, but was later changed as transposes activity was not found.

== Function ==
ZBED1 is located in the pseudoautosomal region 1(PAR) of the X and Y chromosome. ZBED1 is a gene that has a localization in the nucleus and has properties that help it function as a transcription factor as it is able to bind with DNA elements. These Elements can be found in regions that have promoters with several genes in relation to any cell proliferation. Histone H1 being one, at times has the opportunity to regulate genes that are related to cell proliferation. ZBED1 has been found to also have spliced transcript variants that have numerous types of 5' untranslated regions.

== Clininical significance ==
ZBED1 is associated with two diseases those being fibrosclerosis of breast and Sotos Syndrome. Fibrosclerosis of Breast being heavily related to breast disease and non-proliferative fibrocystic change of the best. However, other compatible disease that are also related diseases include; breast cancer, mastitis, gynecomastia, breast fibroadenoma, papilloma, diabetic mast-patchy, vascular disease, and systemic scleroderma. All diseases ranging with scores 10.0 to 9.7 and non-proliferative fibrocystic that changes the breast having the highest affiliating gene. This disease is known to be a non-proliferative fibrocystic that changes the breast as a result of containing scar tissue. Sotos Syndrome is globally known as a genetic disease, rare disease and in some cases fetal disease. Sotos syndrome has a large relatedness to many other disease these being; overgrowth syndrome, Sotos syndrome 2, normokalemic periodic paralysis, tremor, hereditary essential, hypokalemic periodic paralysis (type 2), (myotonia, potassium-aggravated), (myotonia), (myasthenia syndrome, congenital,16), torticollis. All rating with scores that vary from 31.6 being the highest to 10.2 being the lowest (left to right).
