= N-acetylserotonin O-methyltransferase-like protein =

Protein-coding gene in the species Homo sapiens

ASMTL
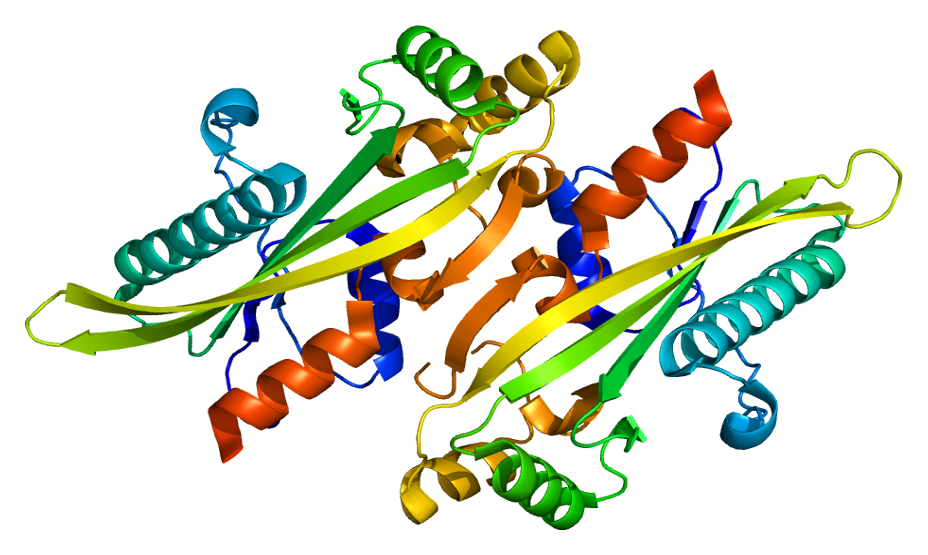

Identifiers
- Aliases: ASMTL, ASMTLX, ASMTLY, ASTML, acetylserotonin O-methyltransferase-like, acetylserotonin O-methyltransferase like
- External IDs: OMIM: 300162, 400011; GeneCards: ASMTL
Available structures
PDB	Human UniProt search: PDBe RCSB
PDB	List of PDB id codes 2P5X
Enzyme activity
EC #	BRENDA	ExPASy	KEGG	MetaCyc
3.6.1.9	↗	↗	↗	↗

Gene location (Human)
Chr.	X chromosome (human)
Band	X;Y	Start	1,403,139 bp
Band	X;Y	End	1,453,762 bp
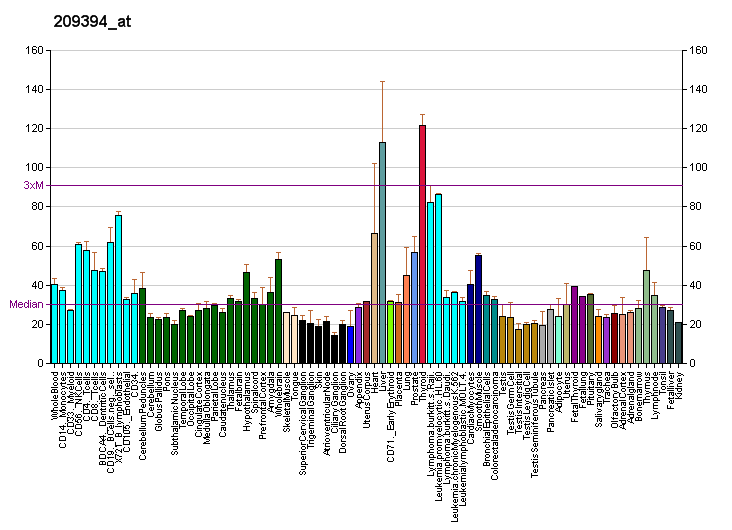

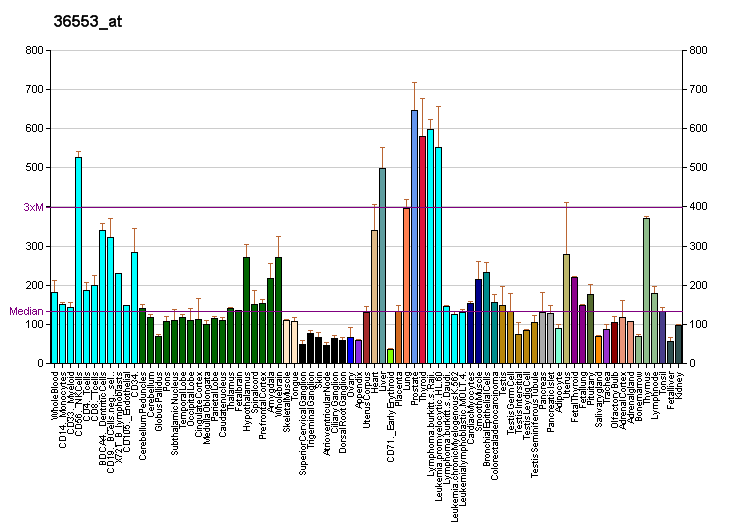
RNA expression pattern
Bgee	Human / Mouse (ortholog); Top expressed in: palpebral conjunctiva; parotid gland; glomerulus; metanephric glomerulus; endothelial cell; parietal pleura; seminal vesicula; pons; pars compacta; epithelium of nasopharynx / n/a; More reference expression data
BioGPS	More reference expression data
Gene ontology
Molecular function	methyltransferase activity; transferase activity; protein binding; O-methyltransferase activity; nucleoside-triphosphate diphosphatase activity; molecular function; nucleotide diphosphatase activity; NADH pyrophosphatase activity; hydrolase activity
Cellular component	cytosol
Biological process	methylation; biological process; nucleotide metabolic process
Sources:Amigo / QuickGO
Orthologs
Databases	NCBI: entry; OMA: entry
Species	Human	Mouse
Entrez	8623	n/a
Ensembl	ENSG00000169093	n/a
UniProt	O95671	n/a
RefSeq (mRNA)	NM_001173473; NM_001173474; NM_004192	n/a
RefSeq (protein)	NP_001166944; NP_001166945; NP_004183	n/a
Location (UCSC)	Chr X: 1.4 – 1.45 Mb	n/a
PubMed search		n/a
- Wikidata
View/Edit Human

N-acetylserotonin O-methyltransferase-like protein is an enzyme that in humans is encoded by the ASMTL gene.
