= GOLPH3 =

Protein-coding gene in the species Homo sapiens

An Error has occurred retrieving Wikidata item for infobox

Golgi phosphoprotein 3 (GOLPH3) is a human protein encoded by GOLPH3 gene. It is a peripheral membrane protein of the Golgi that probably has a regulatory role in Golgi trafficking.

== Clinical significance ==
Golph 3 expression is associated with poor prognosis of various cancers of gastrointestinal tract, such as gastric and esophageal squamous cell carcinoma. Higher expression of GOLPH3 is reported to be associated with greater sensitivity of colorectal cancer to Fluorouracil therapy.
