= Lucitanib =

Chemical compound

Clinical data
- Other names: CO-3810, E-3810
- Routes of administration: By mouth
- ATC code: None

Legal status
- Legal status: Investigational

Pharmacokinetic data
- Elimination half-life: 31–40 hrs

Identifiers
- IUPAC name: 6-({7-[(1-Aminocyclopropyl)methoxy]-6-methoxy-4-quinolinyl}oxy)-N-methyl-1-naphthamide
- CAS Number: 1058137-23-7
- PubChem CID: 25031915
- ChemSpider: 28189586
- UNII: PP449XA4BH
- KEGG: D11762
- ChEBI: CHEBI:65209
- ChEMBL: ChEMBL2180605
- CompTox Dashboard (EPA): DTXSID30147356

Chemical and physical data
- Formula: C_{26}H_{25}N_{3}O_{4}
- Molar mass: 443.503 g·mol^{−1}
- 3D model (JSmol): Interactive image
- SMILES: CNC(=O)c1cccc2c1ccc(c2)Oc3ccnc4c3cc(c(c4)OCC5(CC5)N)OC
- InChI: InChI=1S/C26H25N3O4/c1-28-25(30)19-5-3-4-16-12-17(6-7-18(16)19)33-22-8-11-29-21-14-24(23(31-2)13-20(21)22)32-15-26(27)9-10-26/h3-8,11-14H,9-10,15,27H2,1-2H3,(H,28,30); Key:CUDVHEFYRIWYQD-UHFFFAOYSA-N

Lucitanib (INN) is a drug that is being investigated by Clovis Oncology in clinical trials for the treatment of advanced solid tumours including metastatic breast cancer. It is a protein kinase inhibitor that blocks the VEGF receptors 1, 2 and 3, as well as the fibroblast growth factor receptors 1 and 2, and the platelet-derived growth factor receptors alpha and beta.
