= Sprouty protein =

Sprouty

Identifiers
- Symbol: Sprouty
- Pfam: PF05210
- InterPro: IPR007875
Available protein structures:
- PDB: IPR007875 PF05210 (ECOD; PDBsum)
- AlphaFold: IPR007875; PF05210

In molecular biology, the protein Sprouty is a developmental protein involved in cell signalling. It works by inhibiting the MAPK/ERK pathway.

== Function ==
The function of this protein has been found, in Drosophila to inhibit branching of the trachea by antagonizing the BNL-FGF pathway. Also in Drosophila it is an antagonist of EGFR-mediated signaling in the eye. Most notably, in humans, it suppresses the insulin receptor and EGFR-transduced MAPK signaling pathway, but does not inhibit MAPK activation by a constitutively active mutant Ras. Sprouty inhibits of the Ras/mitogen-activated protein kinase (MAPK) cascade, a pathway crucial for developmental processes initiated by activation of various receptor tyrosine kinases. These proteins share a conserved, C-terminal cysteine-rich region, the SPR domain. This domain has been defined as a novel cytosol to membrane translocation domain. It has been found to be a PtdIns(4,5)P2-binding domain that targets the proteins to a cellular localization that maximizes their inhibitory potential. It also mediates homodimer formation of these proteins.

The SPR domain can occur in association with the WH1 domain (see INTERPRO) (located in the N-terminal part of the proteins) in the Spread proteins.
