= AGGF1 =

Protein-coding gene in the species Homo sapiens

Identifiers
- Aliases: AGGF1, GPATC7, GPATCH7, HSU84971, HUS84971, VG5Q, angiogenic factor with G-patch and FHA domains 1
- External IDs: OMIM: 608464; MGI: 1913799; GeneCards: AGGF1

Gene location (Human)
Chr.	Chromosome 5 (human)
Band	5q13.3	Start	77,029,251 bp
Band	5q13.3	End	77,065,234 bp

Gene location (Mouse)
Chr.	Chromosome 13 (mouse)
Band	13|13 D1	Start	95,487,191 bp
Band	13|13 D1	End	95,511,860 bp
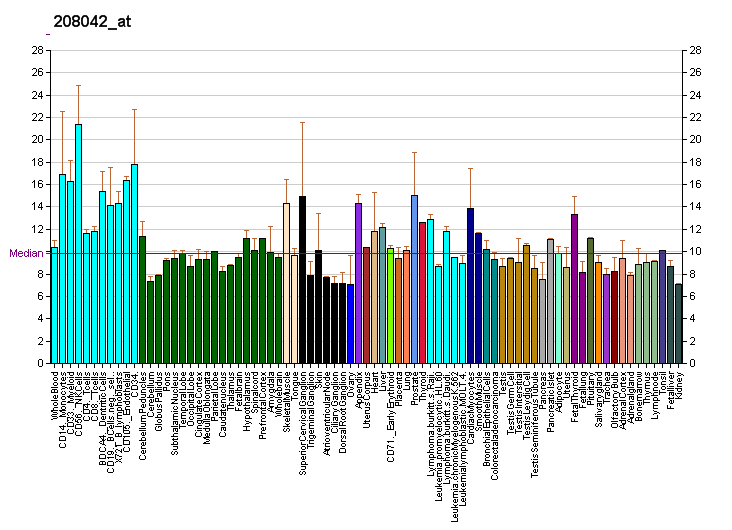

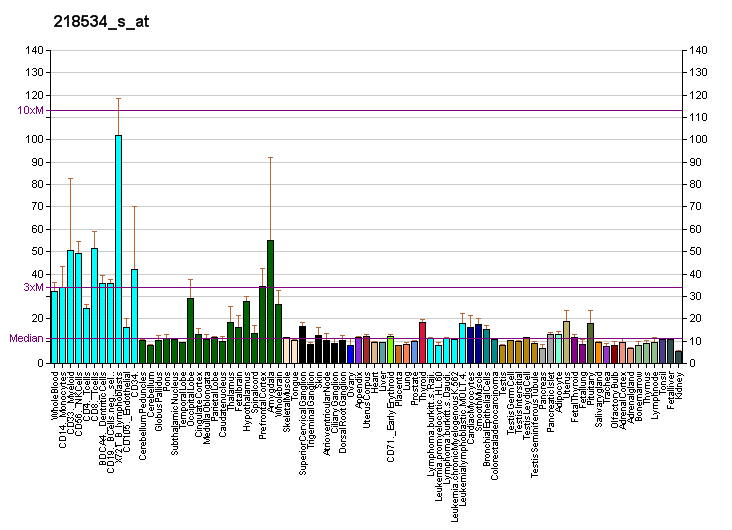
RNA expression pattern
Bgee	Human / Mouse (ortholog); Top expressed in: Epithelium of choroid plexus; epithelium of nasopharynx; palpebral conjunctiva; Brodmann area 23; germinal epithelium; visceral pleura; Skeletal muscle tissue of biceps brachii; parietal pleura; corpus epididymis; middle temporal gyrus / Top expressed in: Gonadal ridge; vestibular membrane of cochlear duct; pineal gland; cumulus cell; Paneth cell; vas deferens; deep cerebellar nuclei; medial vestibular nucleus; medial dorsal nucleus; condyle; More reference expression data
BioGPS	More reference expression data
Gene ontology
Molecular function	protein binding; nucleic acid binding
Cellular component	cytoplasm; perinuclear region of cytoplasm; extracellular region
Biological process	vasculogenesis; multicellular organism development; cell differentiation; cell adhesion; positive regulation of endothelial cell proliferation; angiogenesis; positive regulation of angiogenesis
Sources:Amigo / QuickGO
Orthologs
Databases	NCBI: entry; OMA: entry
Species	Human	Mouse
Entrez	55109	66549
Ensembl	ENSG00000164252	ENSMUSG00000021681
UniProt	Q8N302	Q7TN31
RefSeq (mRNA)	NM_018046; NM_013303; NM_138490	NM_025630
RefSeq (protein)	NP_060516	NP_079906
Location (UCSC)	Chr 5: 77.03 – 77.07 Mb	Chr 13: 95.49 – 95.51 Mb
PubMed search
- Wikidata
View/Edit Human	View/Edit Mouse

Angiogenic factor with G patch and FHA domains 1 is a protein that in humans is encoded by the AGGF1 gene.

AGGF1 is a human gene that functions as an angiogenic factor with a G-patch and forkhead-associated domain. This gene is predominantly expressed in activated, plump endothelial cells and acts to regulate angiogenesis and vascular development. AGGF1 is known to interact with a wide range of proteins involved in vascular development. Mutations to AGGF1 have been implicated in multiple cancers and is known to cause the rare congenital condition, Klippel-Trenaunay syndrome.

== Gene ==
The gene was originally named VG5Q, indicating that it was a vascular gene on chromosome 5, but the name was later changed to reflect its function, instead of just its location.

The AGGF1 gene promoter does not contain a TATA box and contains 2 transcription start sites that are -367 and -364 base pairs ahead of the base translation start site. The gene promoter contains over 50 CpG islands, which makes it a DNA methylation target. AGGF1 is regulated by 2 repressor sites and 2 activator sites. While the presence of 2 repressor and 2 activator sites is clear, the only known transcription factor that regulates AGGF1 is GATA1. GATA1 binds upstream of the AGGF1 gene promoter at -295 and -300, and the binding of GATA1 will lead to increased AGGF1 expression. For the gene to be fully expressed, both of the activator sites must be bound by the transcription factors, GATA1 and another unknown factor.

== Protein ==
To form a protein, an mRNA transcript must be transcribed from the DNA. For AGGF1, the mRNA transcript contains 14 exons and 34 807 nucleotides.

There are 714 amino acids present in this protein, and it has a molecular weight of 80997 Da. It contains a coiled coil domain at positions 18-88 and an OCRE domain at the N terminus. The G-patch domain is located at amino acids 619-663 while the forkhead-associated domain is located at amino acids 435-508. While it is known that these domains are present in the protein, their role in protein function remains unclear.

AGGF1 was the third haploinsufficient human gene identified. Haploinsufficiency means AGGF1 is "dose dependent" so any reductions in protein product can have phenotypic consequences on the vascular development of the organism.

== Expression ==
AGGF1 is largely expressed during early embryonic vein specification, and expression is increased when endothelial cells are activated. While AGGF1 is predominantly functional in endothelial, vascular smooth muscle cells, and osteoblasts, it also has activity in mast cells, cardiac cells, Kupffer cells and hematopoietic stem cells. AGGF1 mRNA has been detected in the heart, kidneys and limbs which indicates that the protein likely also functions in these organs. The proliferation of vascular smooth muscle cells is inhibited when AGGF1 is expressed. It has been found that AGGF1 is highly expressed in some malignant tumours which has implicated AGGF1 in cancer. In vitro models have shown that AGGF1 localizes to cell periphery and directly outside of the cell.

Depending on the mutation type, AGGF1 mutations can be lethal in either the heterozygous or homozygous genotype due to its haploinsufficiency. Mice models have shown that heterozygous mutations can cause fatality due to hemorrhaging while homozygous mutations can prevent proper stem cell differentiation.

== Homology ==
Aggf1 is not unique to humans. This gene is conserved across many species, such as chimpanzees, rhesus monkeys, dogs, cows, mice, rats, chickens, and frogs. There are 212 organisms that have genes which are orthologs to AGGF1.

Within the human chromosome, there are pseudogenes related to AGGF1 are located on chromosomes 3, 4, 10 and 16 that have likely arisen due to translocation events.

== Function ==
AGGF1 functions to regulate angiogenesis and vascular development. Gene ontology has also implicated AGGF1 in cell adhesion, positive regulation of angiogenesis and endothelial cell proliferation. Additionally, AGGF1 has been shown to protect against inflammation and ischemic injuries. During embryongenesis, AGGF1 is required for hematopoietic stem cell specification and the differentiation of hematopoietic and endothelial cell lineages. Specifically, it regulates vascular endothelial cadherin (VE-cadherin) by inhibiting the phosphorylation of the cadherin and increasing its presence in the plasma membrane of endothelial cells. AGGF1 is critical to the specification of veins and multipotent hemangioblasts, anti-inflammation, tumour angiogenesis, and inhibition of vascular permeability. Additionally, it activates autophagy in specific cell types, such as endothelial cells, cardiac HL1 and H9C2 cells, and vascular smooth muscle cells.

== Interactions ==
AGGF1 directly and indirectly interacts with many proteins. There are direct interactions between AGGF1 and TNFSF12, another secreted angiogenic factor, that leads to increased angiogenesis. AGGF1 acts upstream of hemangioblast genes such as scl, fil1, and etsrp. AGGF1 acts similarly to VEGF - another gene implicated in vascular growth. Additionally, AGGF1 is known to activate catalytic and regulatory subunits of PI3K. This leads to downstream activation of AKT, GSK3b and p70S6K signalling pathway which leads to vein specification and angiogenesis. AGGF1 also interacts with vein specific markers such at flt4, dab2, and ephB4. Ccl2 has also been shown to interact with AGGF1 in hepatocytes through blocking NF-κB/p65 from binding to Ccl2. AGGF1 activity is eliminated when Elk is overexpressed. AGGF1 regulates autophagy by regulating expression of JNK genes. SMAD7 and Aggf1 directly interact in the liver to inhibit fibrogenesis. The presence of DNMT3b will repress AGGF1 by acting on the promoter region of the gene.

== Clinical significance ==
=== Klippel-Trenaunay syndrome ===
Heterogeneous mutations in this gene causing deregulation of expression can lead to the vascular malformations associated with Klippel-Trenaunay syndrome (KTS). Due to the haploinsufficient nature of AGGF1, individuals who have even one mutant allele may have KTS. Studies done in mouse models have shown frequent haemorrhages and increased vascular permeability has been seen in mice who are heterozygous for AGGF1. A translocation between the chromosome 5 q-arm at region 13 in band 3 and the chromosome 11 p-arm at region 15 in band 1 has been implicated in KTS. This translocation affects the AGGF1 promoter so there is a 3 fold increase in protein production. Single nucleotide polymorphisms in intron 11 and exon 7 were associated with KTS susceptibility even though neither of these SNPs resulted in an amino acid change. At one point, the E133K allele was thought to be a mutational hotspot - due to altered phosphorylation - causing KTS, but it has since been found as much as 3.3% of the population are carriers for the mutation.

=== Heart disease ===
AGGF1 has also been implicated in treatment after vascular smooth muscle cell damage due to coronary artery disease and myocardial infarction. By blocking vascular permeability and regulating vascular smooth muscle cell phenotypic switching, AGGF1 protein therapy is currently being investigated as a new method of treating both of these diseases.

=== Cancer ===
Aberrant AGGF1 has been implicated in multiple cancers and functions in tumour initiation and progression. For example, both hepatocellular carcinoma and gastric cancer survivability is related to the levels of AGGF1 expression in tumours. AGGF1 has been found to have higher expression in tumours than the surrounding tissues, and higher levels of AGGF1 are associated with a poor patient prognosis.

== See also ==
- Klippel-Trenaunay syndrome
