= Proteus syndrome =

Human genetic disorder

- Other names: Partial gigantism-nevi-hemihypertrophy-macrocephaly syndrome, Wiedemann syndrome
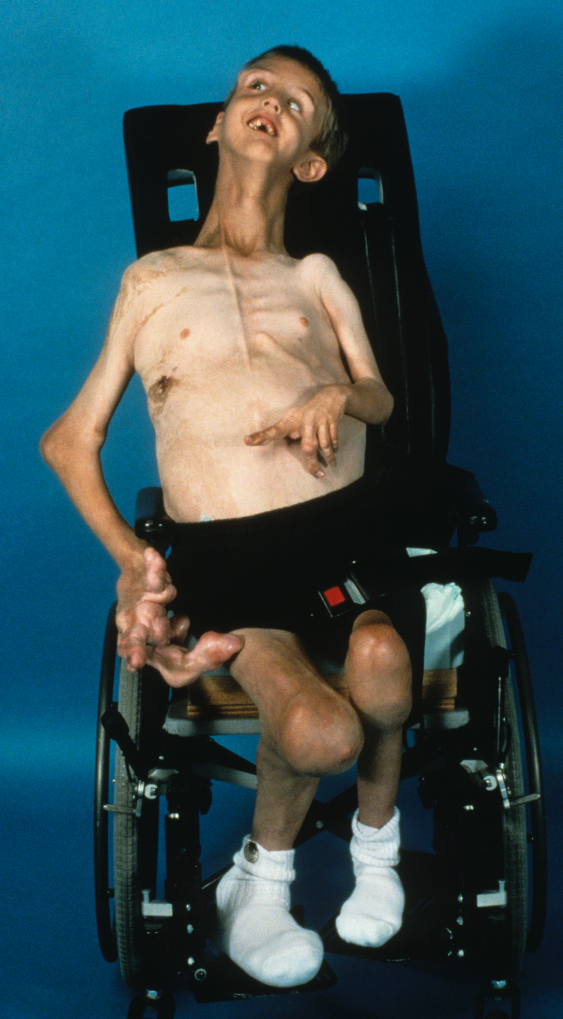
- Alex Green, a 7-year-old boy with Proteus syndrome, confirmed to have the AKT1 p.E17K somatic variant. Alex died at the age of 9.
- Specialty: Medical genetics
- Symptoms: Macrodactyly, Macrocephaly, Scoliosis
- Differential diagnosis: Neurofibromatosis type I Sotos syndrome Beckwith–Wiedemann syndrome
- Frequency: 0.0001%

Proteus syndrome is a rare genetic disorder that can cause tissue overgrowth involving all three embryonic germinal layers. Patients with Proteus syndrome tend to have an increased risk of embryonic tumor development. The clinical symptoms and radiographic findings of Proteus syndrome are highly variable, as are its orthopedic manifestations.

Just over 200 cases have been confirmed worldwide, with estimates that about 120 people are currently alive with the condition. As attenuated forms of the disease may exist, there could be many people with Proteus syndrome who remain undiagnosed. Those most readily diagnosed are also the most severely disfigured.

The syndrome is named after the Greek sea god Proteus, who could change his shape. The condition appears to have been first described in the American medical literature by Samia Temtamy and John Rogers in 1976. American-born, Canadian Michael Cohen described what is now considered Proteus syndrome in 1979.

== Signs and symptoms ==
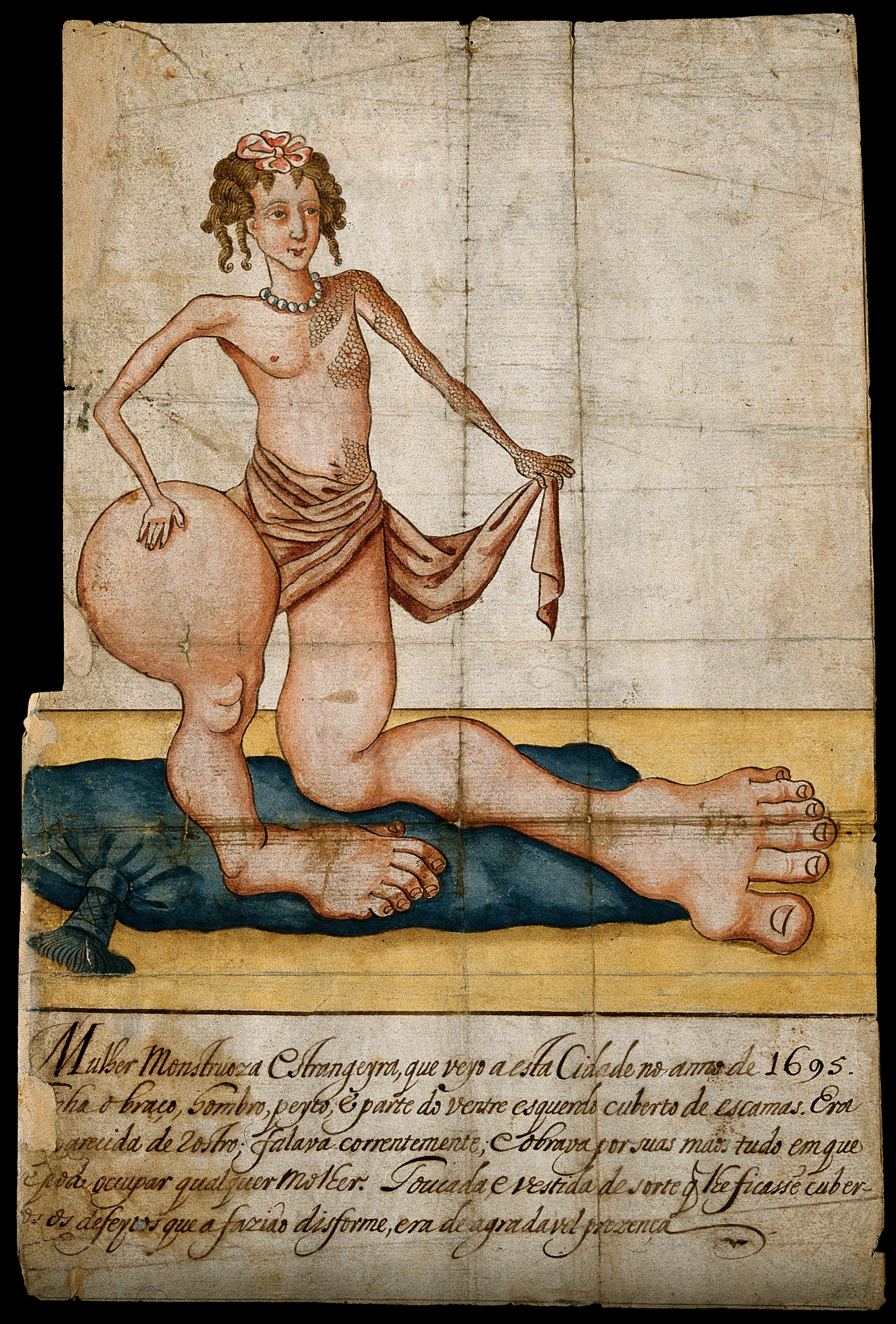
Portuguese illustration of a foreign woman with deformities indicative of Proteus syndrome, 1695

Proteus syndrome causes an overgrowth of skin, bones, muscles, fatty tissues, and blood and lymphatic vessels. Proteus syndrome is a progressive condition wherein children are usually born without any obvious deformities. Tumors of skin and bone growths appear as they age typically in early childhood. The musculoskeletal manifestations are cardinal for the diagnosis of Proteus syndrome. The severity and locations of these asymmetrical growths vary greatly but typically the skull, one or more limbs, and soles of the feet will be affected. There is a risk of premature death in affected individuals due to deep vein thrombosis and pulmonary embolism caused by the vessel malformations that are associated with this disorder. Because of carrying excess weight and enlarged limbs, arthritis and muscle pain may also be symptoms. Further risks may occur due to the mass of extra tissue.

While the disorder does not uniformly cause learning impairments, the distribution of intelligence deficits among those with Proteus syndrome does appear higher than that of the general population, but this is difficult to determine with statistical significance. In addition, the presence of visible deformity hurts the social experiences of the affected individual, causing emotional difficulties, social rejection and stigma.

Affected individuals are at increased risk for developing certain tumors including unilateral ovarian cystadenomas, testicular tumors, meningiomas, and monomorphic adenomas of the parotid gland.

Hemimegalencephaly is often found to be associated.

=== Orthopaedic features ===
The musculoskeletal manifestations of Proteus syndrome are frequent and recognizable. Patients tend to demonstrate a unique pattern of skeletal abnormalities. The orthopaedic features are usually bilateral, asymmetrical, and progressive, and involve all four limbs and the spine. Affected patients usually have localized periarticular limb distortions, limb length discrepancy, and spine deformity. Patients with Proteus syndrome can have regular bone configuration and contours despite the bone enlargement. Patients can also exhibit deformation of the skull in the form of dolichocephaly or elongated skull and facial abnormalities. Because of the rarity of the syndrome and the variability of signs, orthopaedic management should be individualized.

== Genetics ==
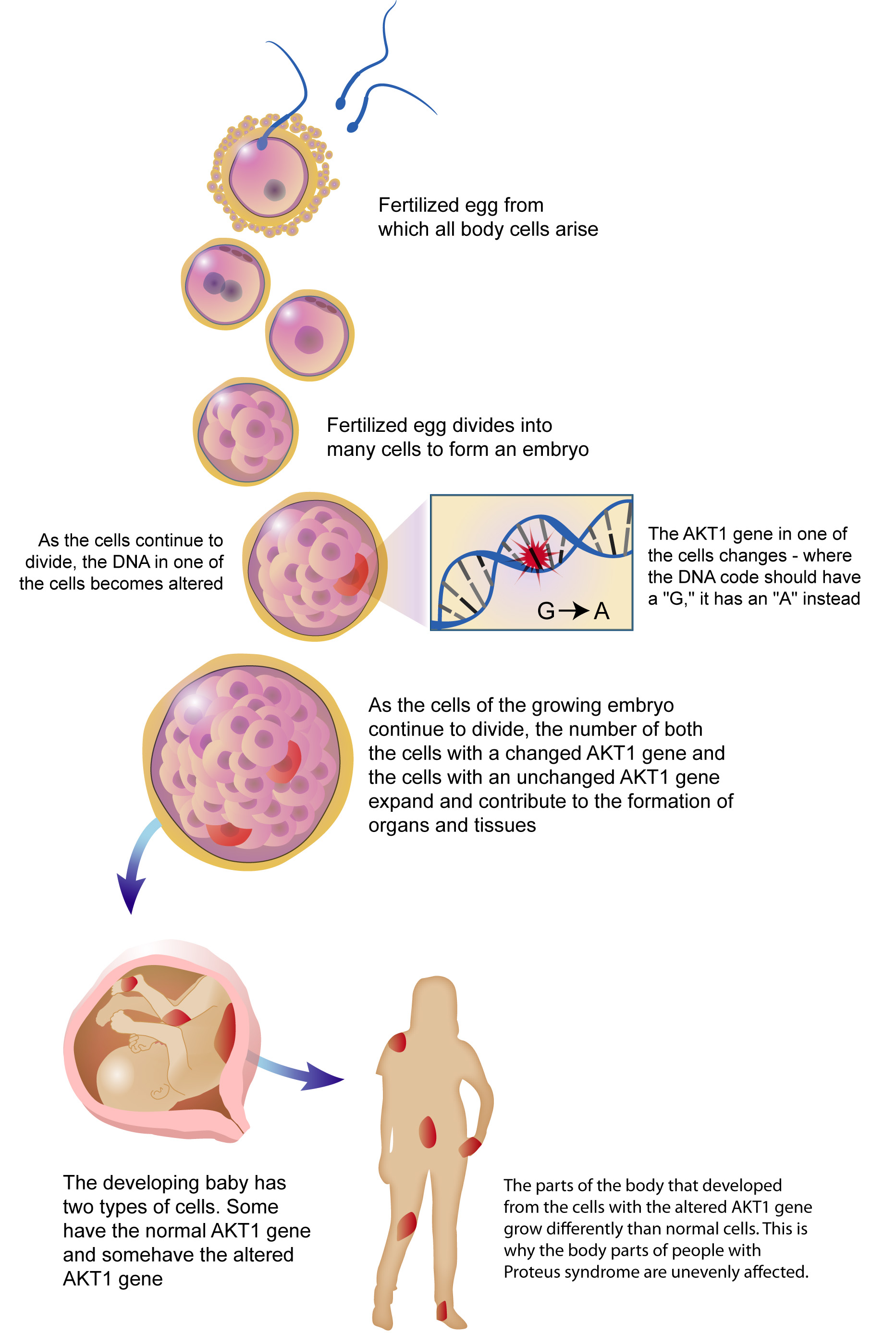
Proteus syndrome is an overgrowth disorder caused by a rare genetic mosaicism. A genetic mutation during embryonic development gives rise to overgrowth in a subset of the individual's cells.

In 2011 researchers determined the cause of Proteus syndrome. In 26 of 29 patients who met strict clinical criteria for the disorder, Lindhurst et al. identified an activating mutation in AKT1 kinase in a mosaic state.

Previous research had suggested the condition was linked to PTEN on chromosome 10, while other research pointed to chromosome 16. Before the findings regarding AKT1 in 2011, other researchers expressed doubt regarding the involvement of PTEN or GPC3, which codes for glypican 3 and may play a role in regulating cell division and growth regulation.

== Diagnosis ==
=== Differential diagnosis ===
- Macrodystrophia lipomatosa
- Fibrolipomatous hamartoma
- Neurofibromatosis type 1
- Klippel–Trénaunay syndrome
- Parkes Weber syndrome
- Sotos syndrome
- Hemangiomas
- Beckwith-Wiedemann syndrome

=== Classification ===
Many sources classify Proteus syndrome as a type of nevus syndrome. The lesions appear to be distributed in a mosaic manner. It has been confirmed that the disorder is an example of genetic mosaicism.

== Treatment ==
A team of doctors in Australia has trial-tested the drug rapamycin in the treatment of a patient said to have Proteus syndrome and have found it to be an effective remedy. However, the diagnosis of Proteus syndrome in this patient has been questioned by others.

The Arqule Corporation developed the AKT1 inhibitor ARQ 092, which is being tested by a research team in the National Human Genome Research Institute at the United States National Institutes of Health in a Phase 0 dose-finding trial. In earlier tests on tissue and cell samples obtained from patients, ARQ 092 reduced phosphorylation of AKT and downstream targets of AKT in as little as two hours. The Phase 0 trial opened in November 2015. This trial is based on in vitro data showing inhibition of AKT1 in cell lines from patients with Proteus syndrome.

== Notable cases ==
In a 1986 article in the British Medical Journal, Michael Cohen and J.A.R. Tibbles proposed the idea that Joseph Merrick, an Englishman known as the "Elephant Man", had Proteus syndrome—which was dramatized in the film The Elephant Man (1980), as portrayed by John Hurt. However, the exact condition Merrick had is still not known with certainty.

Mandy Sellars has been diagnosed by some doctors as having this condition. Her legs and feet have grown disproportionately since birth. However, in 2013, Sellars's case was profiled on British television in a special called Shrinking My 17 Stone Legs, in which it was determined that Sellars's condition was not, in fact, Proteus syndrome, but rather the often-misdiagnosed PIK3CA-related overgrowth spectrum, a syndrome caused by a PIK3CA gene mutation.

== See also ==
- Epidermal nevus syndrome
- Mosaic (genetics)
- Overgrowth syndrome
- List of radiographic findings associated with cutaneous conditions
