= Matthias Schlitte =

German professional arm wrestler

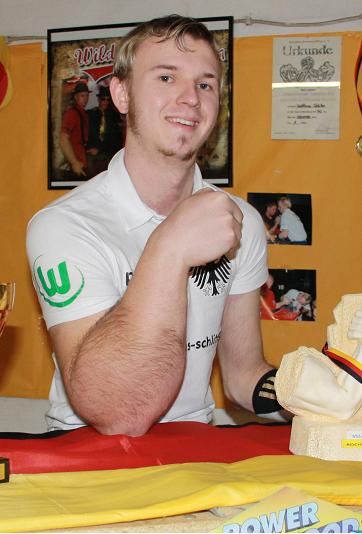
- Occupation: Professional arm wrestler
- Years active: 2004–present

Matthias Schlitte (born 1986 or 1987), known professionally as Hellboy, is a German professional arm wrestler. He is known for his extremely large right arm, caused by Klippel–Trénaunay–Weber syndrome. He began arm wrestling in 2004 at the age of 16, in his hometown of Haldensleben, Saxony-Anhalt, and has since has won multiple national and international championships.
