= Mandy Sellars =

British woman with genetic mutation (born 1975)

- Born: 20 February 1975 (age 51); Lancashire, England
- Education: University of Central Lancashire
- Known for: Local gigantism in both legs
- Website: mandysellars.com

Mandy Sellars (born 20 February 1975 in Lancashire, United Kingdom) is a British woman with a rare genetic mutation that has resulted in extraordinary growth in both of her legs.

In 2006, some doctors diagnosed Sellars as having Proteus syndrome, a very rare condition thought to affect only 120 people worldwide, but more recent diagnoses have focused on a PIK3CA gene mutation. Some reports still describe her condition as a rare form of Proteus syndrome, but Sellars herself has disputed the diagnosis.

Sellars's condition has been covered in several television programmes, leading Sellars to jokingly describe herself as a "part-time TV star".

== Biography ==
Sellars was born with abnormally large and misshapen legs and feet, which continued to grow at a disproportionate rate. In a November 2009 interview, she estimated that she weighed about 21 stone (294 lb or 133 kg): 6 stone (84 lb or 38 kg) for her upper body and the remainder in her legs and feet (210 lb or 95 kg).

Doctors were unable to provide a diagnosis for many years, until some doctors decided on Proteus syndrome in May 2006, though Sellar's condition is atypical in many respects. The most famous person with Proteus syndrome may be Joseph Merrick, the "Elephant Man". There is no known cure.

When she was born, doctors were unsure if she would survive very long. However, she was walking at about 18 months. When it was recommended to her mother, June, that the then seven-year-old have her legs amputated, June refused in order to provide as normal life as possible for her child.

At 19 (in 1994), Mandy Sellars moved out to live on her own. She obtained a B.Sc. in psychology from the University of Central Lancashire, and maintained an independent lifestyle as an adult, with no live-in helpers. She got around using crutches or a wheelchair, and had a specially modified hand-controlled car.

When Sellars was 28 (in 2003), she suffered a deep vein thrombosis, which left her paralysed from the waist down for about six or eight weeks. Afterward, she had to learn to walk again. Three years later, she got a blood infection, her kidneys failed, and she contracted MRSA.

Ultimately, it was expected that she would have to have her legs amputated. When the television documentary series Extraordinary People devoted an episode to her called "The Woman with Giant Legs" (2008), it paid for her trip to the United States to consult "renowned orthopaedic surgeon Dr. William Ertl and prosthetic whiz Kevin Carroll." After examining her, they gave her hope that she would be able to have a less drastic amputation than the one recommended by her doctors, which would have severely curtailed her independence.

Her left leg was amputated above the knee in 2010. It was the subject of a TV documentary, Losing One of My Giant Legs. Twenty-two months after the surgery, her leg began to grow at an accelerated rate and her limb began to balloon again.

In 2013, Sellars' case was again profiled on British television in a special called Shrinking My 17 Stone Legs. Gene sequencing revealed a PIK3CA mutation affecting half of her body, confirming that Sellars' condition is not Proteus syndrome. Based on the genetic information, she was prescribed rapamycin, and experienced some reduction after 90 days.

She has been a founder of a charity supporting those with related conditions, and as of 2021 she is very active supporting other sufferers and raising awareness of the condition.
