= Frederick Parkes Weber =

British dermatologist

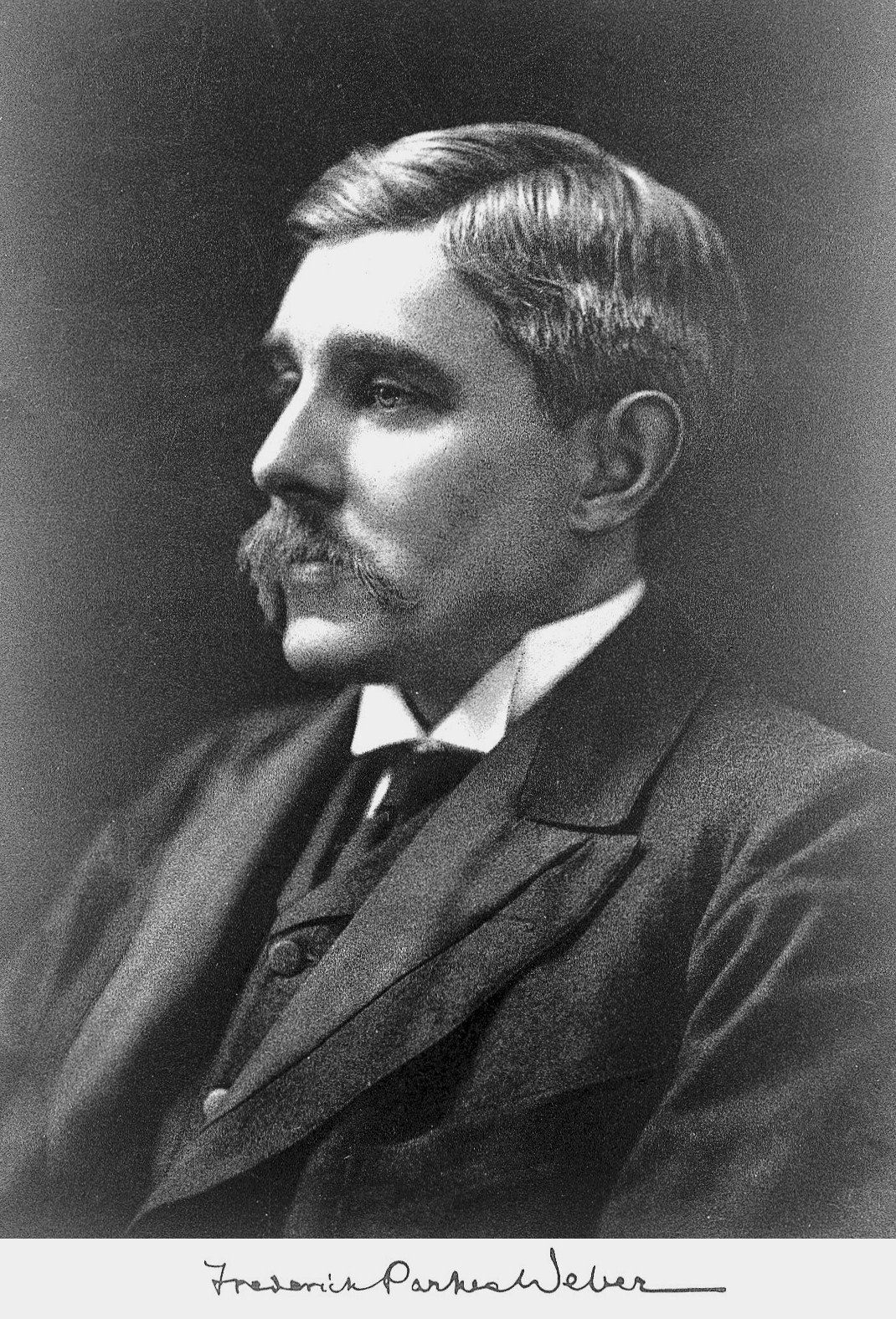
Frederick Parkes Weber

Frederick Parkes Weber (8 May 1863 – 2 June 1962) was an English dermatologist and author who practiced medicine in London.

== Background ==
Weber's father, Sir Hermann David Weber (1823–1918), was a personal physician to Queen Victoria.

Weber was educated at Charterhouse and Trinity College, Cambridge. He subsequently studied medicine at St. Bartholomew's Hospital, and abroad at Vienna and Paris.

== Career ==
Returning to England, he worked (since 1894) at the German Hospital, Dalston (London), later he became House Physician and House Surgeon at St. Bartholomew's Hospital. He was subsequently House Physician at Brompton Hospital and Physician at Mount Vernon Hospital.

Weber contributed over 1200 medical articles and wrote 23 books over a period of 50 years. In 1922, he, along with his wife, published a philosophical medical tome called Aspects of Death and Correlated Aspects of Life in Art, Epigram, and Poetry. Weber was a prodigious describer of new and unique dermatological terms. A comprehensive collection of Weber's papers is kept by the London Wellcome Library.

== Hobby ==
Together with his father, Weber was an avid coin collector; their numismatic collection being donated to several places, such as the Boston Medical Library, the British Museum, the Bodleian Library at Oxford, and Fitzwilliam College at Cambridge. He was a long-standing member of the Royal Numismatic Society, which to this day awards the Parkes Weber Prize.

== Conditions ==
His name is ascribed to several disorders such as:

- Klippel–Trénaunay–Weber syndrome: A rare syndrome characterized by enlarged veins and arteries, limb hypertrophy and capillary malformations. Named with Maurice Klippel and Paul Trénaunay.
- (Pfeifer–)Weber–Christian disease: A skin disease characterized by fever and panniculitis with atrophy of the subcutaneous fatty layer of the skin. Named with Victor Pfeifer and Henry Asbury Christian.
- Osler–Weber–Rendu disease: A syndrome characterised by small enlarged blood vessels near the surface of the skin (telangiectasia), as well as the oral, nasal and gastrointestinal mucous membranes. Named with Henri Jules Louis Marie Rendu and William Osler.
- Sturge–Weber syndrome: A congenital disorder involving the brain, skin and eyes. In 1922, Weber reported the first radiologic features of brain atrophy in the disease. Named with William Allen Sturge.
- Weber–Cockayne syndrome: A form of epidermolysis bullosa. Named with Edward Alfred Cockayne.
- Parkes Weber syndrome: A rare congenital vascular malformation.
