= Extraordinary People (2003 TV series) =

2003 TV series

Extraordinary People is a television documentary series broadcast on Channel 5 in the United Kingdom. Each programme follows the lives of people with a rare medical condition and/or unusual ability. People featured have or had rare illnesses such as rabies and eye cancer. Many of these people do activities previously thought impossible for people in their condition.

The show began airing on 28 March 2003.

== List of people featured ==
- Petero Byakatonda, a Crouzon syndrome patient
- Ellie, Georgie, Holly, and Jessica Carles, the first known identical quadruplets in Britain
- David Fitzpatrick, fugue state (amnesia) sufferer
- Jeanna Giese, the first rabies survivor, who was successfully treated with the experimental Milwaukee protocol after being bitten by an infected bat
- Abby and Brittany Hensel, dicephalic parapagus conjoined twins
- Akrit Jaswal, who performed his first surgery at age seven
- Dede Koswara, an Indonesian man with a form of HPV (epidermodysplasia verruciformis) which causes tree-like growths
- Florence "Flo" & Katherine "Kay" Lyman, identical twin savants
- Cameron Macaulay, a boy from Barra, Scotland who claimed to have memories of a past life as an American airman in World War II
- José Mestre, who suffered a huge, life-threatening facial tumor
- John and Jeanette Murphy, an American couple who, in addition to having four children of their own, have adopted 23 with special needs
- Hayley Okines, an English girl who had progeria
- Derek Paravicini, a blind savant and musical prodigy
- Kim Peek, a savant
- Oscar Pistorius, amputee athlete
- Sarah Scantlin, who awoke and began speaking again after twenty years in a coma
- Mandy Sellars, woman whose legs grew to life-threatening proportions
- Shiloh Pepin, a girl who had sirenomelia or Mermaid Syndrome
- Budhia Singh, an Indian boy who ran a 40-mile marathon at the age of four
- Daniel Tammet, an autistic savant with synesthesia
- Ben Underwood, an American man who had lost both eyes to retinal cancer, but was able to use echolocation to help him navigate the environment and use objects
- Luciana Wulken, a young girl with fibrodysplasia ossificans progressiva
- Zahra Aboutalib, a woman from Morocco who lived for 46 years carrying a lithopedion after the death of an abdominal fetus
- Jane Ingram, an English woman from Suffolk who successfully gave birth to healthy triplets, one of whom was an abdominal pregnancy
- Terri Calvesbert, an English teenager who sustained and survived burns over 90% of their body
