= EMK =

EMK may refer to:

- Communist Movement of Euskadi (Basque: Euskadi Mugimendu Komunista)
- Eastern Maninka language
- Early Middle Korean
- Emmonak Airport, in Alaska
- ELKL Motif Kinase; see MARK2
- Evangelisch-methodistische Kirche, the United Methodist Church in Germany
- Several organizations named for US Senator Edward M. Kennedy, such as the Edward M. Kennedy Institute for the United States Senate in Boston, Massachusetts
