= Michael Cohen (doctor) =

American scientist and doctor

- Born: March 28, 1937; Boston, Massachusetts, United States
- Died: February 11, 2018 (aged 80); Nova Scotia, Canada
- Occupations: Pathologist and geneticist

M. Michael Cohen Jr., DDS, PhD, MS (March 28, 1937 – February 11, 2018) was an American oral pathologist and geneticist who was Professor Emeritus of Pediatrics, Faculty of Medicine, Dalhousie University (Emeritus). He was one of the first clinicians to describe what is now known as Proteus syndrome, in 1979.

== Life and career ==
Cohen was born in Boston, Massachusetts, and studied at the University of Michigan, Tufts University, the University of Minnesota, and Boston University. His post-graduate training included a fellowship in pathology and medical genetics with Robert Gorlin (1923–2006), an oral pathologist and geneticist who described a large number of syndromes, including one they delineated together known as Gorlin–Cohen syndrome.

Cohen held a bachelor's degree and doctorate in anthropology; he received a Doctor of Dental Surgery and a master's degree in oral and maxillofacial pathology; he also held a certificate in international health. After serving as Professor of oral and maxillofacial surgery and pediatrics at the University of Washington in Seattle, he moved to Dalhousie University in Canada. He retired to Emeritus in 2006.

Cohen wrote more than 450 articles; was the author, co-author or editor of 11 books, and contributed more than 28 chapters to other books.

Cohen died of pneumonia on February 11, 2018, in Nova Scotia. He is buried in the Shaar Shalom Cemetery in Halifax.

== See also ==
- Joseph Merrick, "The Elephant Man"
