= Facial infiltrating lipomatosis =

- Other names: Congenital infiltrating lipomatosis of the face
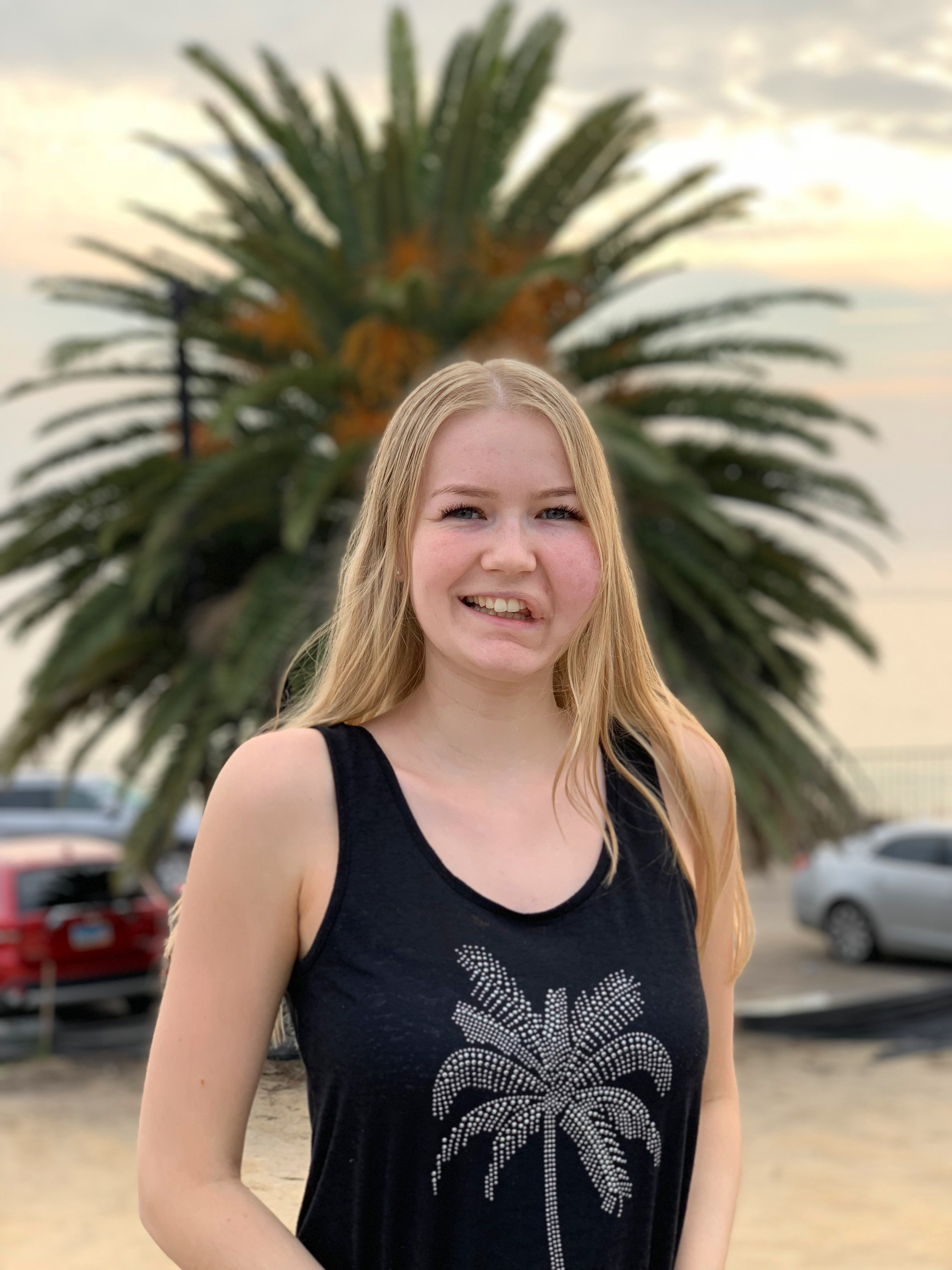
- Dutch blogger and YouTuber Wilma Westenberg suffers from FIL
- Causes: genetic mutation of the PIK3CA gene

Facial infiltrating lipomatosis (FIL), also referred to as congenital infiltrating lipomatosis of the face or facial infused lipomatosis, is an ultra-rare craniofacial overgrowth condition caused by a genetic mutation of the PIK3CA gene. The condition is a part of the PIK3CA related overgrowth spectrum (PROS). The disease is congenital and non-hereditary. It was first described by Slavin and colleagues in 1983.

For this disease the mutation causes overgrowth of half of the face (hemifacial). It affects both soft and hard tissue (facial skeleton). The condition is noticeable at birth by the asymmetrical cheeks, with one cheek being prominently larger than the other.

== Signs & symptoms ==
Congenital hemifacial enlargement in which mature lipocytes invade adjacent tissue. Phenotypic features include soft-tissue and skeletal hypertrophy and regional macrodontia. The manifestations are variable ranging from mild to severe. The overgrowth is typically present at birth. The most common features, all features on only one affected side of the face, are:

- Increased adipose tissue compared to the other side. The fat is infiltrating with no clear separation from the adjacent tissue.
- Hypertrophy of the skeleton including teeth.
- Early eruption of ipsilateral deciduous and permanent teeth
- The parotid and submandibular gland including accessory tissue is larger.
- Epidermal nevus / nevus sebaceous on the affected side.
- Increased adipose tissue behind the orbital and pterygopalatine fossa.
- Amblyopia of the eye.
- Overgrowth of the ear.
- Mucosal neuromas
- Cutaneous capillary blush
- Ipsilateral macroglossia
- Syndromic hemimegalencephaly

Not all patients with facial infiltrating lipomatosis have all these symptoms.

== Cause ==
Mutations in the PIK3CA gene have been identified as the cause for facial infiltrating lipomatosis. The mutation is de novo and mosaic meaning it's new, not inherited and not occurring in every cell. One of the DNA nucleotides was altered, causing a change in the amino acid put being into the protein, referred to as a missense mutation, and for PROS, this gives an overactivity, "gain-of-function". The gene is a part of PI3K-AKT/mTOR pathway, a pathway crucial to cell growth, survival, angiogenesis and proliferation.

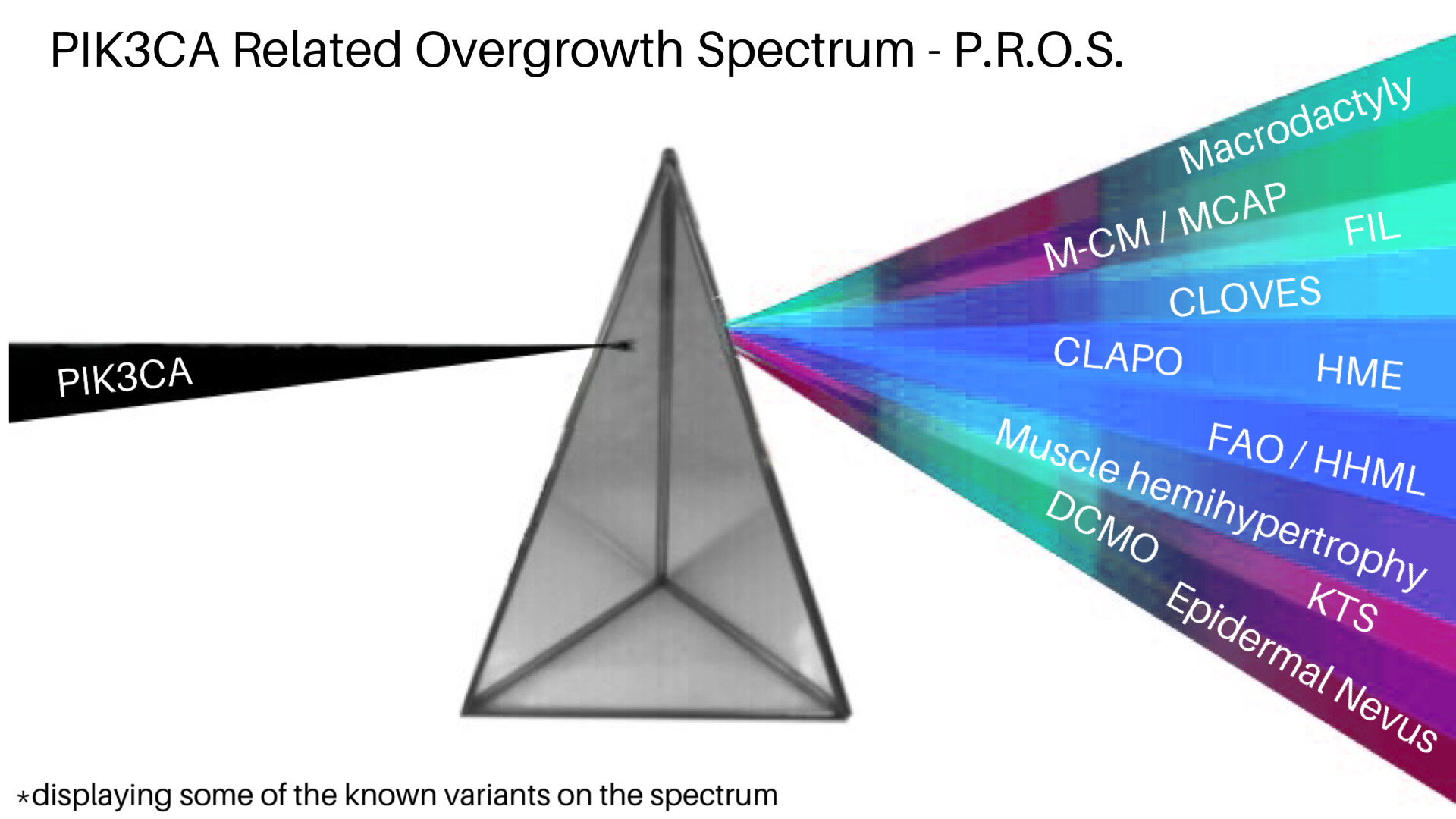
Illustration of the PIK3CA Related Overgrowth Spectrum

== Treatment ==
There is no cure for FIL/PROS. Management usually consists of multiple debulking surgeries and/or drug treatment. Due to the infiltrating fat in important facial structures complete excision of the overgrowth is often impossible and there is a high risk of regrowth after resection.

The current drug treatment options are either a mTOR inhibitor, a pan AKT (AKT1-2-3) inhibitor or a PIK3CA inhibitor. The mTOR inhibitor is an off-label use, the use of the AKT-inhibitor is currently in a clinical trial (MOSAIC) and the PIK3CA inhibitor is only available through compassionate use program (if one is eligible).
