= Plexin A1 =

Protein-coding gene in the species Homo sapiens

PLXNA1

Identifiers
- Aliases: PLXNA1, NOV, NOVP, PLEXIN-A1, PLXN1, Plexin A1
- External IDs: OMIM: 601055; MGI: 107685; GeneCards: PLXNA1

Gene location (Human)
Chr.	Chromosome 3 (human)
Band	3q21.3	Start	126,982,693 bp
Band	3q21.3	End	127,037,389 bp

Gene location (Mouse)
Chr.	Chromosome 6 (mouse)
Band	6|6 D1	Start	89,293,296 bp
Band	6|6 D1	End	89,339,602 bp
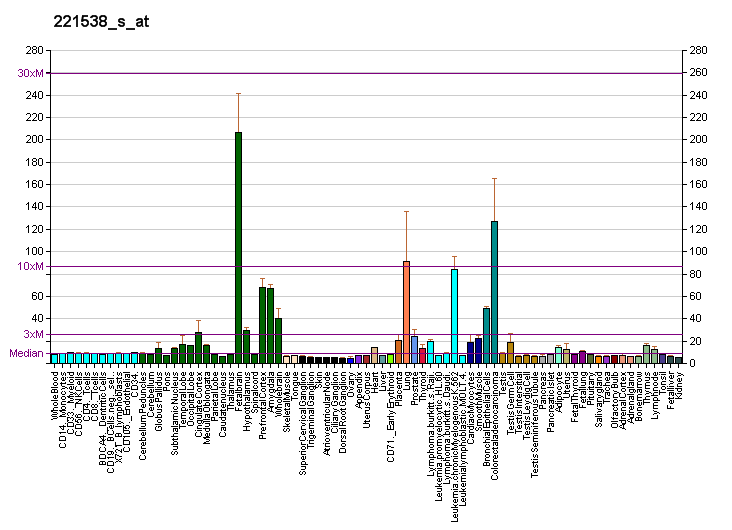

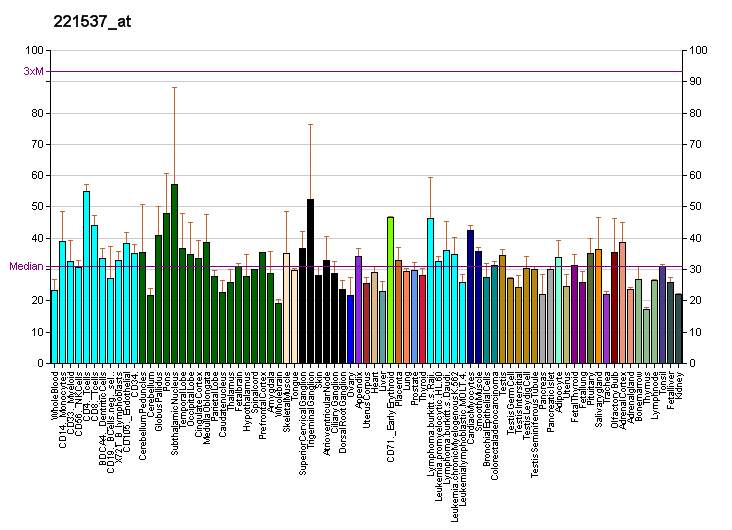
RNA expression pattern
Bgee	Human / Mouse (ortholog); Top expressed in: middle temporal gyrus; stromal cell of endometrium; Brodmann area 23; endothelial cell; sural nerve; gingival epithelium; Brodmann area 46; superior frontal gyrus; Region I of hippocampus proper; orbitofrontal cortex / Top expressed in: genital tubercle; tail of embryo; bronchus; lobar bronchus; lip; dentate gyrus of hippocampal formation granule cell; ascending aorta; secondary oocyte; primary visual cortex; internal carotid artery; More reference expression data
BioGPS	More reference expression data
Gene ontology
Molecular function	semaphorin receptor activity; signaling receptor activity
Cellular component	integral component of membrane; membrane; plasma membrane; semaphorin receptor complex; extracellular exosome; integral component of plasma membrane
Biological process	regulation of axon extension involved in axon guidance; neuron projection extension; multicellular organism development; neuron projection guidance; branchiomotor neuron axon guidance; dichotomous subdivision of terminal units involved in salivary gland branching; regulation of smooth muscle cell migration; semaphorin-plexin signaling pathway; signal transduction; negative regulation of cell adhesion; regulation of cell shape; regulation of cell migration; regulation of GTPase activity; positive regulation of axonogenesis; semaphorin-plexin signaling pathway involved in axon guidance
Sources:Amigo / QuickGO
Orthologs
Databases	NCBI: entry; OMA: entry
Species	Human	Mouse
Entrez	5361	18844
Ensembl	ENSG00000114554	ENSMUSG00000030084
UniProt	Q9UIW2	P70206
RefSeq (mRNA)	NM_032242	NM_008881
RefSeq (protein)	NP_115618	NP_032907
Location (UCSC)	Chr 3: 126.98 – 127.04 Mb	Chr 6: 89.29 – 89.34 Mb
PubMed search
- Wikidata
View/Edit Human	View/Edit Mouse

Plexin-A1 is a protein that in humans is encoded by the PLXNA1 gene.

== Interactions ==
Plexin A1 has been shown to interact with AKT1.
