= Henri Jules Louis Marie Rendu =

French physician (1844–1902)

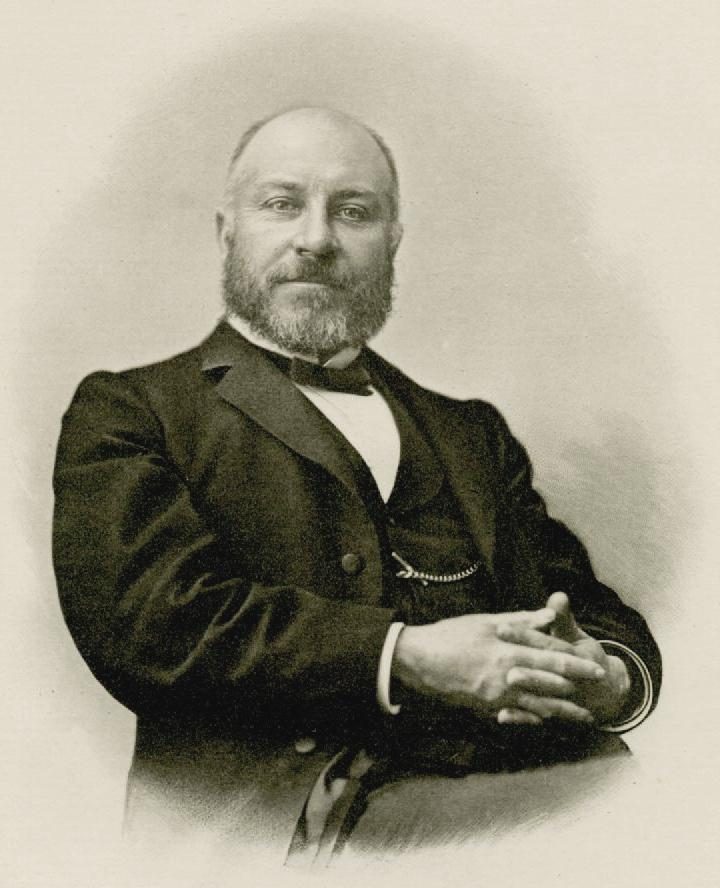
Henri Rendu (1844–1902)

Henri Jules Louis Marie Rendu (24 July 1844 – 16 April 1902) was a French physician born in Paris. He was related to glaciologist Louis Rendu (1789–1859).

He initially received an education in sciences at the school of agronomy in Rennes, and from 1865 studied medicine in Paris, becoming an interne in 1868 at the Hôpital Saint-Antoine. He served as a military surgeon during the Franco-Prussian War, and a few years later worked in the department of Pierre Potain (1825–1901) at the Hôpital Necker in Paris.

In 1877 he became médecin des hôpitaux, earning his agrégation the following year with a dissertation on chronic nephritis called Etude comparative des néphrites chroniques. In 1885 he was appointed head of the department of medicine at Hôpital Necker, a position he maintained for the rest of his career.

In 1897 Rendu was elected to the Académie Nationale de Médecine. He was a prolific writer, with many of his medical articles being published in the Bulletin de la Société anatomique de Paris, of which he was its editor in 1873–74. Throughout his career he held an avid interest in natural sciences, and spent considerable time as a botanical collector.

== Associated medical eponym ==
- Rendu-Osler-Weber disease: A syndrome also known as hereditary hemorrhagic telangiectasia. Eponym named in conjunction with Frederick Parkes Weber and Sir William Osler.

== Written works ==
- Etude comparative des néphrites chroniques, (1878).
- Leçons de clinique médicale. two volumes, Paris, (1890).
- Epistaxis répétés chez un sujet porteur de petits angiomes cutanés et muqueux, (1896).
