= AKTIP =

Protein-coding gene in the species Homo sapiens

Identifiers
- Aliases: AKTIP, FT1, FTS, AKT interacting protein
- External IDs: OMIM: 608483; MGI: 3693832; GeneCards: AKTIP

Gene location (Human)
| Chr. | Chromosome 16 (human) |
| Band | 16q12.2 | Start | 53,491,040 bp |
| Band | 16q12.2 | End | 53,504,411 bp |

Gene location (Mouse)
| Chr. | Chromosome 8 (mouse) |
| Band | 8 C4|8 44.25 cM | Start | 91,838,412 bp |
| Band | 8 C4|8 44.25 cM | End | 91,926,604 bp |
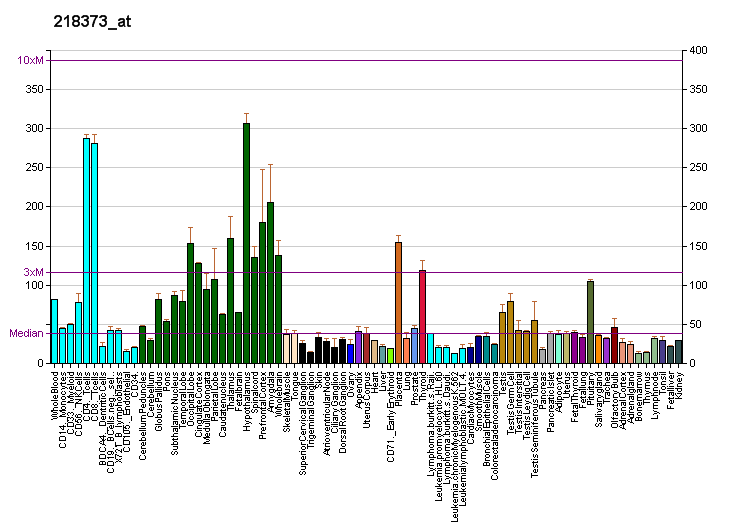
RNA expression pattern
| Bgee | Human / Mouse (ortholog); Top expressed in: secondary oocyte; pons; muscle of thigh; C1 segment; amniotic fluid; prefrontal cortex; amygdala; substantia nigra; anterior cingulate cortex; vastus lateralis muscle / Top expressed in: right kidney; medial vestibular nucleus; deep cerebellar nuclei; neural layer of retina; globus pallidus; central gray substance of midbrain; superior frontal gyrus; lateral hypothalamus; dorsomedial hypothalamic nucleus; cerebellar cortex; More reference expression data |
| BioGPS | More reference expression data |
Gene ontology
| Molecular function | ubiquitin-like protein transferase activity; protein binding; ubiquitin protein ligase binding; ubiquitin protein ligase activity |
| Cellular component | HOPS complex; plasma membrane; membrane; FHF complex; cytosol; cytoplasm |
| Biological process | protein transport; positive regulation of protein binding; positive regulation of protein phosphorylation; lysosome organization; early endosome to late endosome transport; endosome organization; endosome to lysosome transport; apoptotic process; protein ubiquitination |
Sources:Amigo / QuickGO
Orthologs
| Databases | NCBI: entry; OMA: entry |
| Species | Human | Mouse |
| Entrez | 64400 | 14339 |
| Ensembl | ENSG00000166971 | ENSMUSG00000031667 |
| UniProt | Q9H8T0 | Q64362 |
| RefSeq (mRNA) | NM_001012398; NM_001308325; NM_022476 | NM_010241; NM_001302266; NM_001302267; NM_001302268; NM_001302337 NM_001358934; NM_001358935; NM_001358936; NM_001358937; NM_001358938 |
| RefSeq (protein) | NP_001012398; NP_001295254; NP_071921 | NP_001289195; NP_001289196; NP_001289197; NP_001289266; NP_034371 NP_001345863; NP_001345864; NP_001345865; NP_001345866; NP_001345867 |
| Location (UCSC) | Chr 16: 53.49 – 53.5 Mb | Chr 8: 91.84 – 91.93 Mb |
| PubMed search |
- Wikidata
| View/Edit Human | View/Edit Mouse |

AKT-interacting protein is a protein that in humans is encoded by the AKTIP gene.

The mouse homolog of this gene produces fused toes and thymic hyperplasia in heterozygous mutant animals while homozygous mutants die in early development. This gene may play a role in apoptosis as these morphological abnormalities are caused by altered patterns of programmed cell death. The protein encoded by this gene is similar to the ubiquitin ligase domain of other ubiquitin-conjugating enzymes but lacks the conserved cysteine residue that enables those enzymes to conjugate ubiquitin to the target protein. This protein interacts directly with serine/threonine kinase protein kinase B (PKB)/Akt and modulates PKB activity by enhancing the phosphorylation of PKB's regulatory sites. Alternative splicing results in two transcript variants encoding the same protein.

== Interactions ==
AKTIP has been shown to interact with AKT1.

== Molecular genetics ==
The association between the AKTIP gene variants in a sample of 273 bipolar patients using 3 single-nucleotide polymorphisms has been investigated. No association between suicidal behavior and AKTIP variants nor any interaction between AKTIP and AKT1 polymorphisms was observed.
