= PIK3CA-related overgrowth spectrum =

Rare disease of abnormal tissue growth

PIK3CA-related overgrowth spectrum (PROS) is an umbrella term for rare syndromes characterized by malformations and tissue overgrowth caused by somatic mutations in PIK3CA gene. In PROS diseases individual malformations are seen in several different tissues such as skin, vasculature, bones, fat and brain tissue depending on the specific disease.

== Diseases ==
PIK3CA-related overgrowth spectrum diseases include:

- Fibro-adipose vascular anomaly
- Hemihyperplasia–multiple lipomatosis syndrome
- CLOVES syndrome
- Macrodactyly
- Facial infiltrating lipomatosis
- Macrocephaly-capillary malformation
- Dysplastic megalencephaly
- Klippel–Trénaunay syndrome

== Pathophysiology ==
PIK3CA gene codes for p110α protein which is a catalytic subunit of phosphoinositide 3-kinase, a major regulator of several important cellular functions such as cell proliferation, growth and apoptosis. Mutations in PIK3CA cause over-activity of PI3K which in turn leads to altered growth of cells and tissues which is thought to be important for overgrowth and malformations in PROS. Different presentations of PROS diseases are likely explained by acquisition of the mutation in different time points and different cell types during embryonic development

== Treatment ==
Treatment of PROS diseases is variable and depends on the specific disease. Curative treatment does not exist and most treatments are given to control symptoms. Overgrowth and malformations of solid tissues can be treated with surgery. Sclerotherapy can be used to treat vascular malformations. In CLOVES syndrome experimental medical therapy using PIK3CA inhibitor, BYL719, has been reported to be effective to relieve pain and diminish the malformations.
