= Local gigantism =

Condition where a certain body part grows larger than normal size

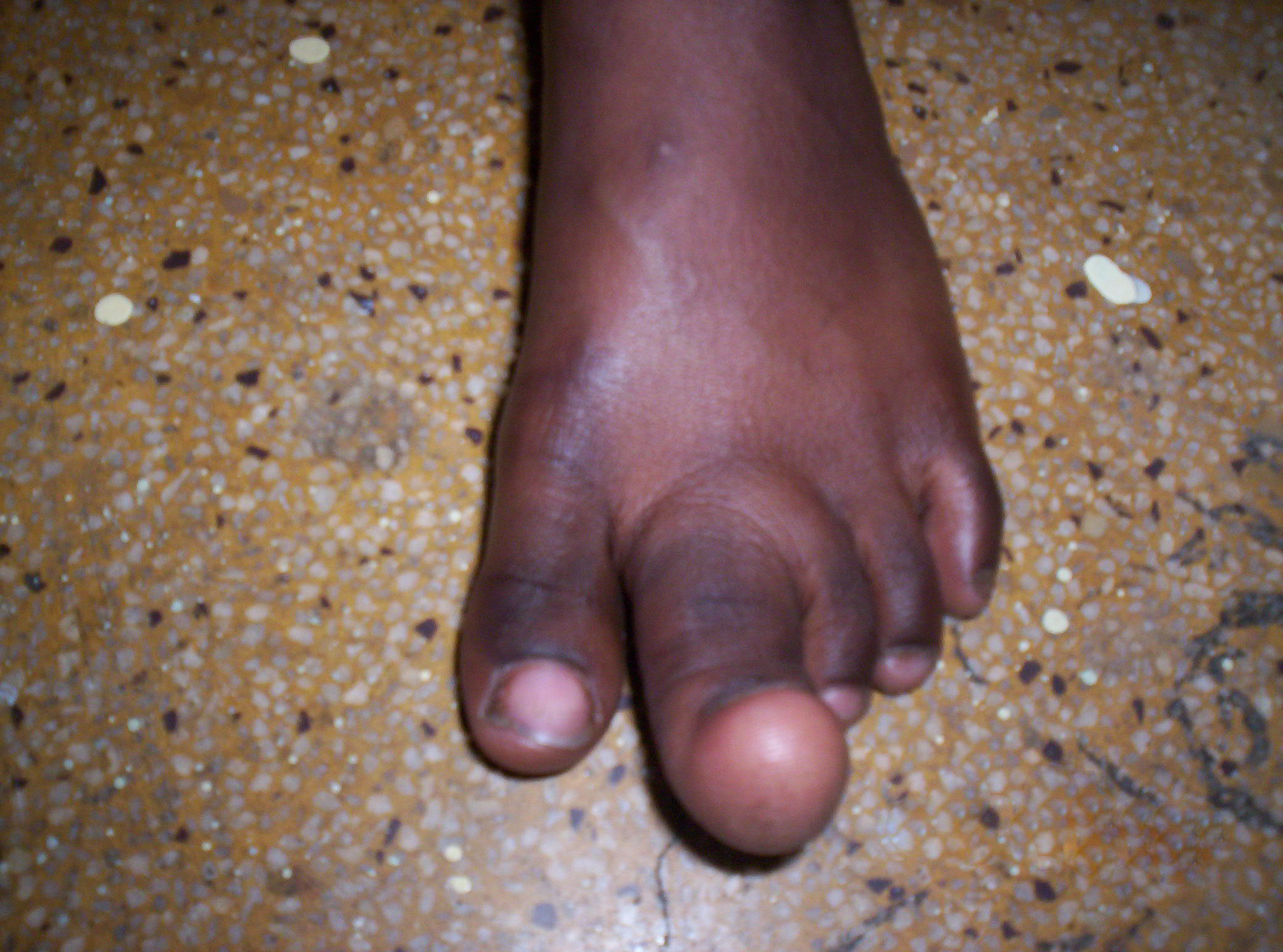
Local gigantism affecting second toe of a child

Local gigantism or localised gigantism is a condition in which a certain part of the body acquires larger than normal size due to excessive growth of the anatomical structures or abnormal accumulation of substances. It is more common in fingers and toes, where it is termed macrodactyly. However, sometimes an entire limb may be enlarged.

== Causes ==
Local gigantism may be caused by a heterogeneous group of both congenital and acquired conditions.

=== Congenital ===
Congenital causes include:

- Klippel–Trénaunay syndrome
- Maffucci syndrome
- macrodystrophia lipomatosa
- neurofibromatosis,
- lipoatrophic diabetes.
- Proteus syndrome, which by one theory accounts for the deformities of the Elephant Man

=== Acquired ===
There are a number of acquired causes of local gigantism. A body part can attain bigger size from causes as common as the following:

- inflammation, due to trauma or infection
- tumors like osteoid osteoma, melorheostosis, and lipofibromatous hamartoma
- Arteriovenous malformations occurring on a limb, before the closure of epiphyses in long bones
- Elephantiasis, which is quite common in southeast Asia due to prevalence of filariasis.
- Still's disease
- amyloidosis
- acromegaly

== Treatment ==
As the causes of local gigantism are varied, treatment depends on the particular condition. Treatment may range from antibiotics and other medical therapy, to surgery in order to correct the anatomical anomaly.
