= MTCP1 =

Protein-coding gene in the species Homo sapiens

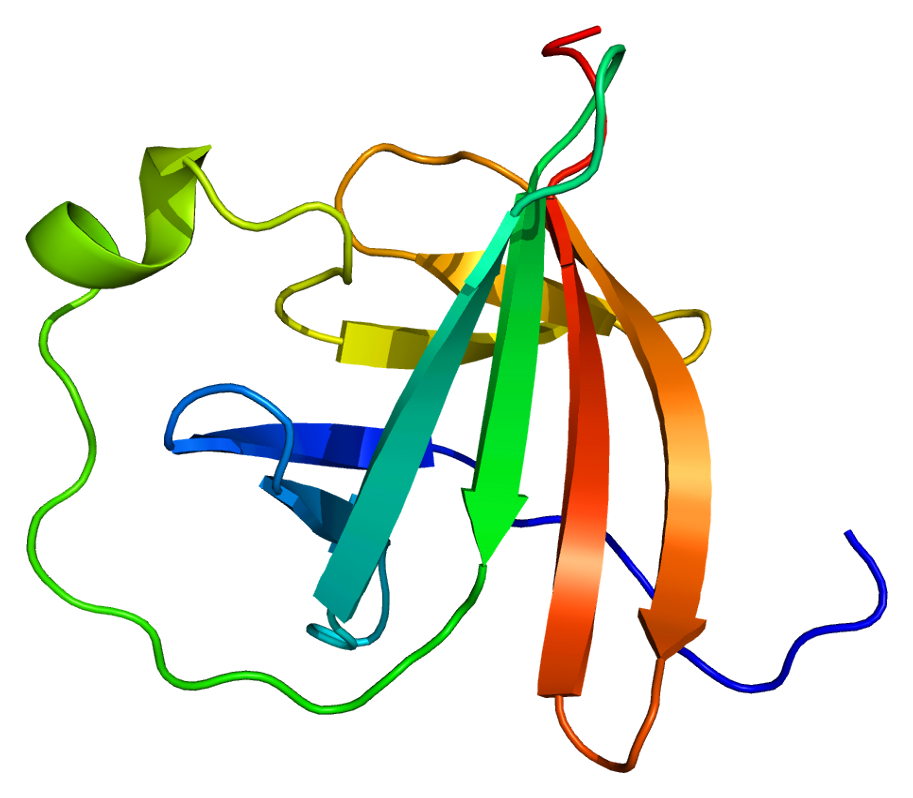
Available structures
| PDB | Ortholog search: PDBe RCSB |
| PDB | List of PDB id codes 1A1X, 1QTT, 1QTU |

Identifiers
- Aliases: MTCP1, P13p8mature T-cell proliferation 1, mature T cell proliferation 1, TCL1C
- External IDs: OMIM: 300116; MGI: 102699; HomoloGene: 82921; GeneCards: MTCP1; OMA:MTCP1 - orthologs

Gene location (Human)
| Chr. | X chromosome (human) |
| Band | Xq28 | Start | 155,064,034 bp |
| Band | Xq28 | End | 155,147,937 bp |

Gene location (Mouse)
| Chr. | X chromosome (mouse) |
| Band | X|X A7.3 | Start | 74,454,050 bp |
| Band | X|X A7.3 | End | 74,460,194 bp |
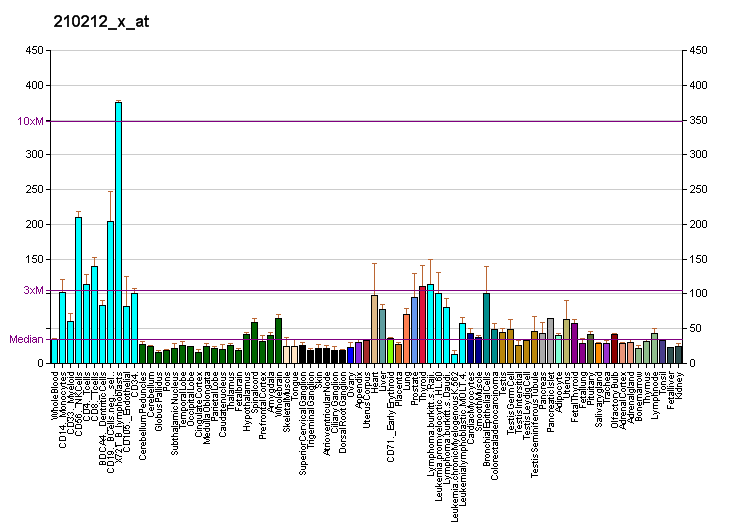

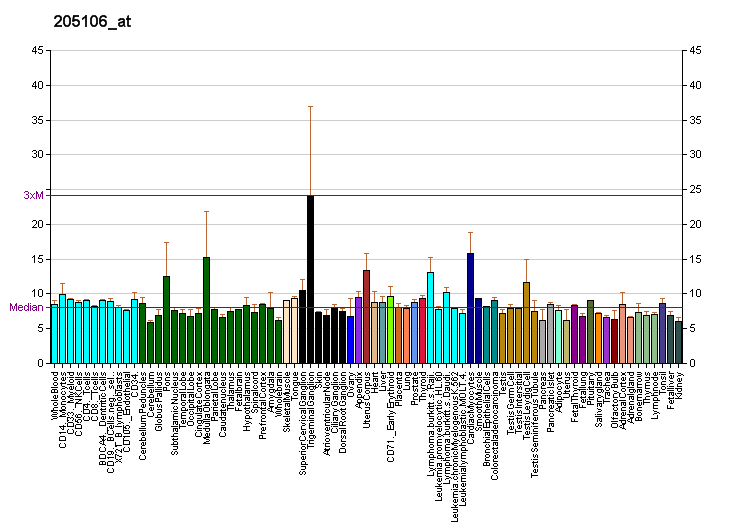

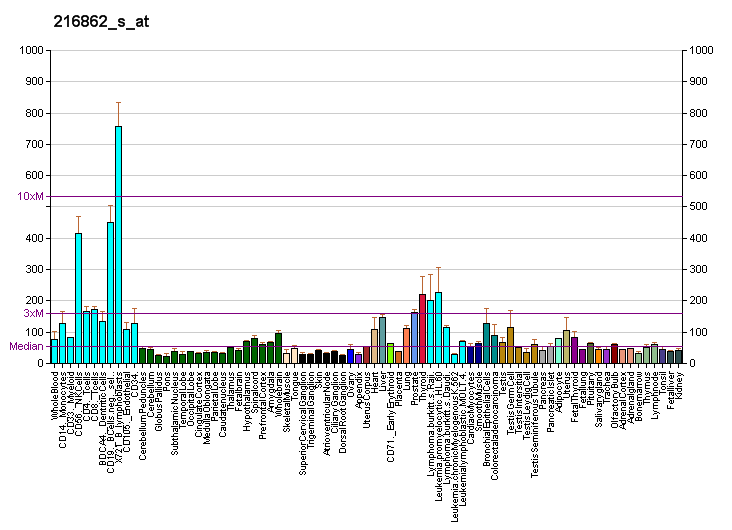
RNA expression pattern
| Bgee | Human / Mouse (ortholog); Top expressed in: testicle; body of pancreas; right testis; right adrenal gland; left testis; left adrenal cortex; right adrenal cortex; left ovary; right ovary; gastric mucosa / Top expressed in: saccule; otic placode; otic vesicle; Rostral migratory stream; right kidney; neural layer of retina; ventricular zone; tail of embryo; embryo; embryo; More reference expression data |
| BioGPS | More reference expression data |
Gene ontology
| Molecular function | protein kinase binding; protein serine/threonine kinase activator activity |
| Cellular component | protein-containing complex |
| Biological process | cell population proliferation; positive regulation of peptidyl-serine phosphorylation; positive regulation of protein serine/threonine kinase activity; positive regulation of cell population proliferation |
Sources:Amigo / QuickGO
Orthologs
| Species | Human | Mouse |
| Entrez | 4515 | 17763 |
| Ensembl | ENSG00000214827 | ENSMUSG00000031200 |
| UniProt | P56278 | Q61908; Q60945 |
| RefSeq (mRNA) | NM_014221; NM_001018025 | NM_001039373 |
| RefSeq (protein) | NP_001018025 | NP_001281206; NP_034969; NP_001034462 |
| Location (UCSC) | Chr X: 155.06 – 155.15 Mb | Chr X: 74.45 – 74.46 Mb |
| PubMed search |
- Wikidata
| View/Edit Human | View/Edit Mouse |

Protein p13 MTCP-1 is a protein that in humans is encoded by the MTCP1 gene.

== Function ==
This gene was identified by involvement in some t(X;14) translocations associated with mature T-cell proliferations. The gene has two ORFs that encode two different proteins. The upstream ORF encodes a 13kDa protein that is a member of the TCL1 family; this protein may be involved in leukemogenesis. The downstream ORF encodes an 8kDa protein that localizes to mitochondria. Alternative splicing results in multiple transcript variants.

== Interactions ==
MTCP1 has been shown to interact with AKT1.
