= José Mestre =

Portuguese man with angioma (1956–2021)

- Born: 1956; Monte Costa Moreanes, Portugal
- Died: December 17, 2021 (aged 64–65)
- Other names: José Francisco Vaz Mestre
- Known for: Angioma in the face, medical condition

José Mestre (1956 – December 17, 2021) was a man known for having a 40 cm (16 in), 5 kg (11 lb) haemangioma tumor on his face. The tumor started forming on his lips when he was 14. Mestre had not received treatment for the tumor due to "years of medical misinformation, some misdiagnosis, lack of finances, and reluctance to undergo treatment due to religious beliefs."

A documentary titled "The Man with No Face", part of the television series My Shocking Story, aired on the Discovery Channel on 6 December 2007.

In 2010, Mestre underwent four operations during a period of four months at Saint Joseph Hospital in Chicago. The life-threatening tumor was completely removed by Dr. McKay McKinnon during the first procedure, with the following three operations necessary to reconstruct his face. He was expected to return to Portugal a few weeks after the final operation.
