= Ovarian cystadenoma =

Ovarian cystadenoma is a cystic benign tumor of the ovary. Two types are recognized: serous and mucinous. Ovarian cystadenomas are common benign epithelial neoplasms that carry an excellent prognosis.
