= Arteriovenous malformation =

Abnormal connection between arteries and veins, bypassing the capillaries

- Other names: AVM
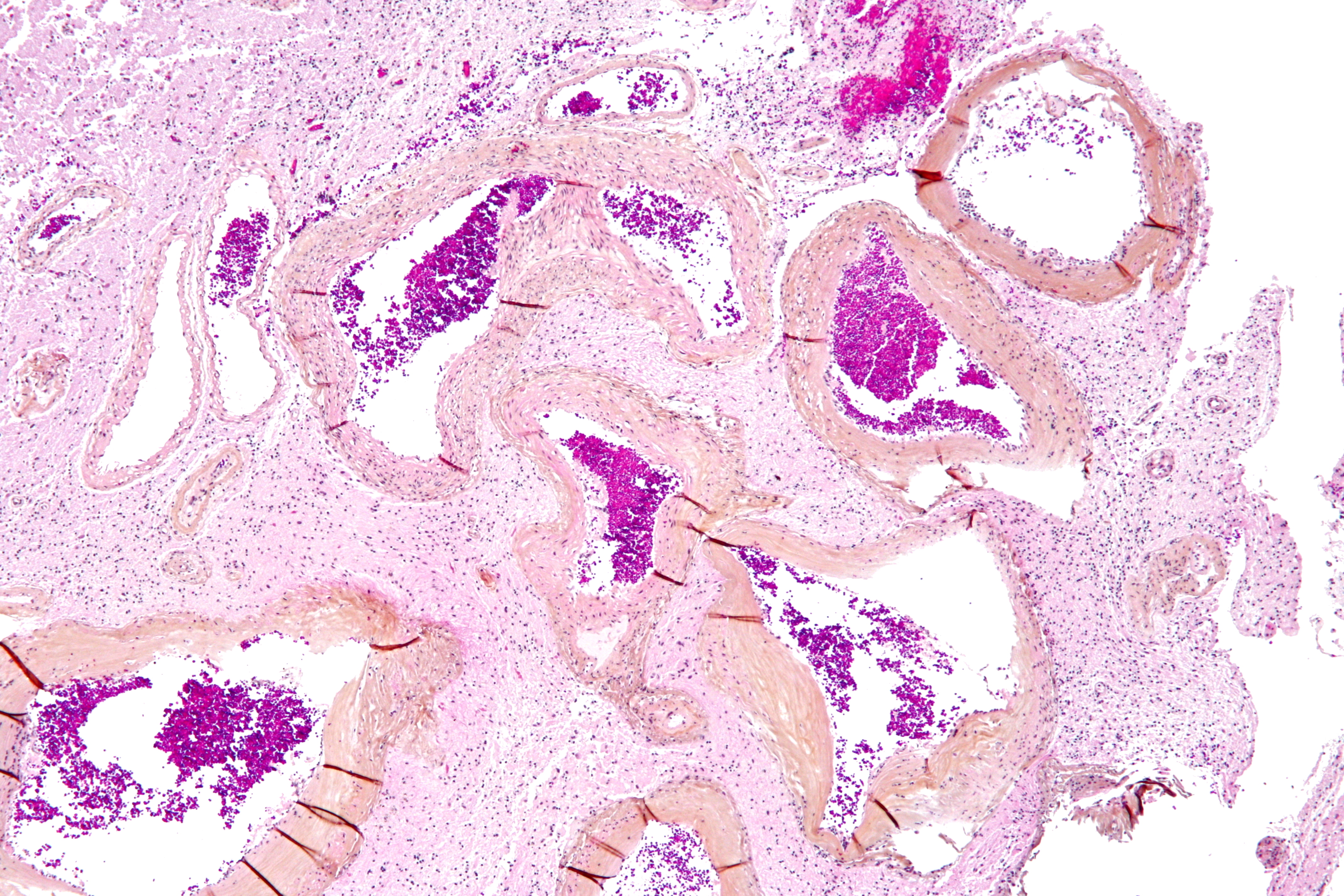
- Micrograph of an arteriovenous malformation in the brain. HPS stain.
- Specialty: Neurosurgery
- Diagnostic method: CT, MRI, MRA

An arteriovenous malformation (AVM) is an abnormal connection between arteries and veins, bypassing the capillary system. Usually congenital, this vascular anomaly is widely known because of its occurrence in the central nervous system (usually as a cerebral AVM), but can appear anywhere in the body. The symptoms of AVMs can range from none at all to intense pain or bleeding, and they can lead to other serious medical problems.

== Signs and symptoms ==
Symptoms of AVMs vary according to their location. Most neurological AVMs produce few to no symptoms. Often the malformation is discovered as part of an autopsy or during treatment of an unrelated disorder (an "incidental finding"); in rare cases, its expansion or a micro-bleed from an AVM in the brain can cause epilepsy, neurological deficit, or pain.

The most general symptoms of a cerebral AVM include headaches and epileptic seizures, with more specific symptoms that normally depend on its location and the individual, including:

- Difficulties with movement coordination, including muscle weakness and even paralysis;
- Vertigo (dizziness)
- Difficulties of speech (dysarthria) and communication, as found with aphasia
- Difficulties with everyday activities, as found with apraxia
- Abnormal sensations (numbness, tingling, or spontaneous pain)
- Memory and thought-related problems, such as confusion, dementia, or hallucinations

Cerebral AVMs may present themselves in a number of different ways:

- Bleeding (45% of cases)
- "parkinsonism" 4 symptoms in Parkinson's disease
- Acute onset of severe headache. May be described as the worst headache of the patient's life. Depending on the location of bleeding, may be associated with new fixed neurologic deficit. In unruptured brain AVMs, the risk of spontaneous bleeding may be as low as 1% per year. After a first rupture, the annual bleeding risk may increase to more than 5%.
- Seizure or brain seizure (46%). Depending on the place of the AVM, it can contribute to loss of vision.
- Headache (34%)
- Progressive neurologic deficit (21%)
  - May be caused by mass effect or venous dilations. Presence and nature of the deficit depends on location of the lesion and the draining veins.
- Pediatric patients
  - Heart failure
  - Macrocephaly
  - Prominent scalp veins

=== Pulmonary arteriovenous malformations ===
Pulmonary arteriovenous malformations are abnormal communications between the veins and arteries of the pulmonary circulation, leading to a right-to-left blood shunt. They have no symptoms in up to 29% of all cases, however they can give rise to serious complications including hemorrhage, and infection. They are most commonly associated with hereditary hemorrhagic telangiectasia.

== Genetics ==
AVMs are usually congenital and are part of the RASopathy family of developmental syndromes. The understanding of the anomaly's genetic transmission patterns are incomplete, but there are known genetic mutations (for instance in the epithelial line, tumor suppressor PTEN gene) which can lead to an increased occurrence throughout the body.

The anomaly can occur due to autosomal dominant diseases, such as hereditary hemorrhagic telangiectasia.

== Pathophysiology ==
In the circulatory system, arteries carry blood away from the heart to the lungs and the rest of the body, where the blood normally passes through capillaries—where oxygen is released and waste products like carbon dioxide (CO_{2}) absorbed—before veins return blood to the heart. An AVM interferes with this process by forming a direct connection of the arteries and veins, bypassing the capillary bed. AVMs can cause intense pain and lead to serious medical problems. Although AVMs are often associated with the brain and spinal cord, they can develop in other parts of the body.

As an AVM lacks the dampening effect of capillaries on the blood flow, the AVM can get progressively larger over time as the amount of blood flowing through it increases, forcing the heart to work harder to keep up with the extra blood flow. It also causes the surrounding area to be deprived of the functions of the capillaries. The resulting tangle of blood vessels, often called a nidus (Latin for 'nest'), has no capillaries. It can be extremely fragile and prone to bleeding because of the abnormally direct connections between high-pressure arteries and low-pressure veins. One indicator is a pulsing 'whoosh' sound caused by rapid blood flow through arteries and veins, which has been given the term bruit (French for 'noise'). If the AVM is severe, this may produce an audible symptom which can interfere with hearing and sleep as well as cause psychological distress.

== Diagnosis ==
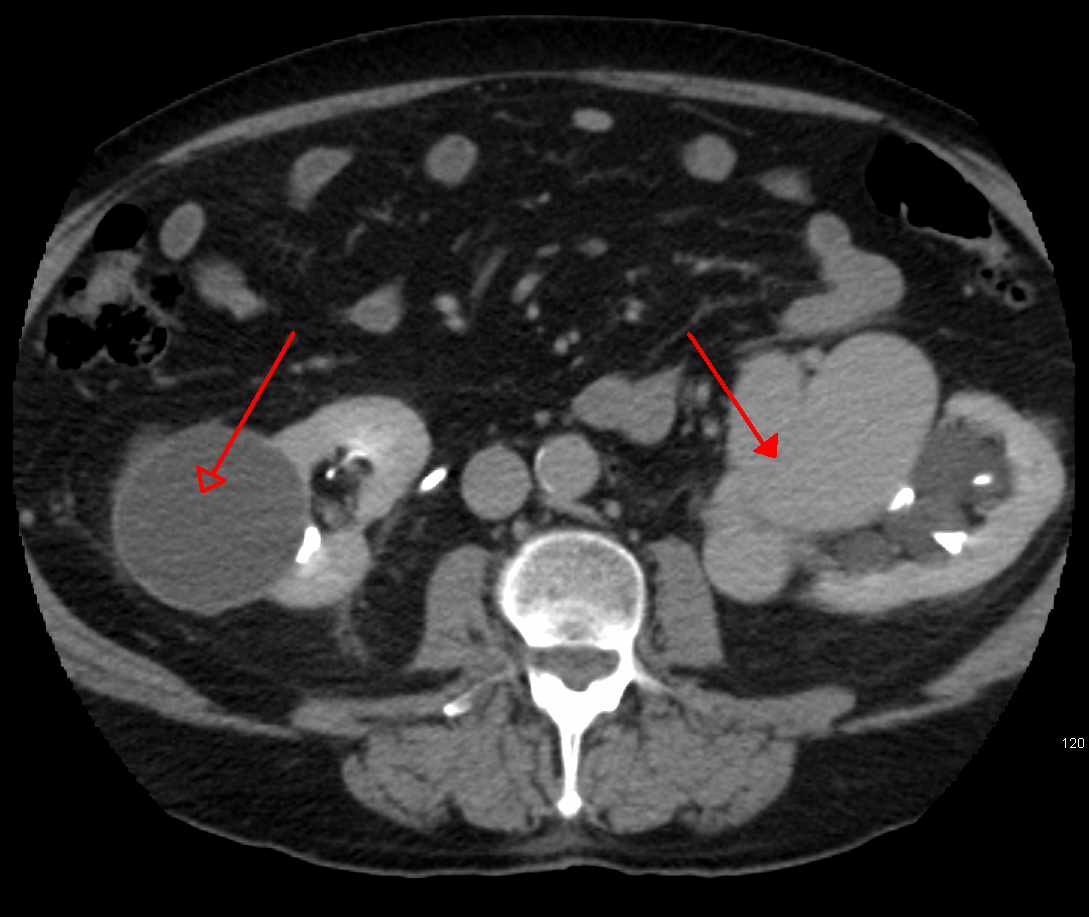
An arterial venous malformation of the left kidney and a simple cyst of the right kidney

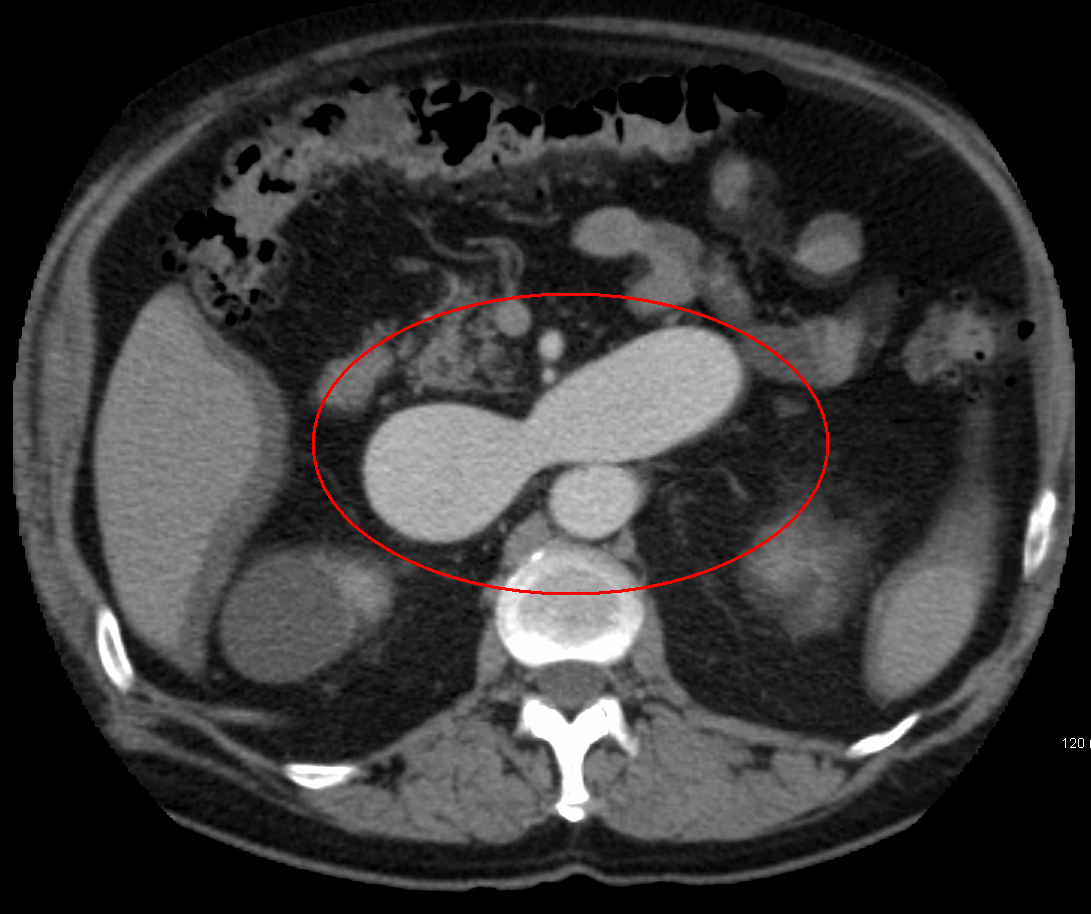
An arterial venous malformation of the left kidney leading to aneurysmal dilatation of the left renal vein and inferior vena cava

AVMs are diagnosed primarily by the following imaging methods:

- Computed tomography (CT) scan is a noninvasive X-ray to view the anatomical structures within the brain to detect blood in or around the brain. A newer technology called CT angiography involves the injection of contrast into the blood stream to view the arteries of the brain. This type of test provides the best pictures of blood vessels through angiography and soft tissues through CT.
- Magnetic resonance imaging (MRI) scan is a noninvasive test, which uses a magnetic field and radio-frequency waves to give a detailed view of the soft tissues of the brain.
- Magnetic resonance angiography (MRA) – scans created using magnetic resonance imaging to specifically image the blood vessels and structures of the brain. A magnetic resonance angiogram can be an invasive procedure, involving the introduction of contrast dyes (e.g., gadolinium MR contrast agents) into the vasculature (circulatory system) of a patient using a catheter inserted into an artery and passed through the blood vessels to the brain. Once the catheter is in place, the contrast dye is injected into the bloodstream and the MR images are taken. Additionally or alternatively, flow-dependent or other contrast-free magnetic resonance imaging techniques can be used to determine the location and other properties of the vasculature.

AVMs can occur in various parts of the body:

- brain (cerebral AV malformation)
- spleen
- lung
- kidney
- spinal cord
- liver
- intercostal space
- iris
- spermatic cord
- extremities – arm, shoulder, etc.

AVMs may occur in isolation or as a part of another disease (for example, Sturge-Weber syndrome or hereditary hemorrhagic telangiectasia).

AVMs have been shown to be associated with aortic stenosis.

Bleeding from an AVM can be relatively mild or devastating. It can cause severe and less often fatal strokes.

== Treatment ==
Treatment for AVMs in the brain can be symptomatic, and patients should be followed by a neurologist for any seizures, headaches, or focal neurologic deficits. AVM-specific treatment may also involve endovascular embolization, neurosurgery or radiosurgery. Embolization, that is, cutting off the blood supply to the AVM with coils, particles, acrylates, or polymers introduced by a radiographically guided catheter, may be used in addition to neurosurgery or radiosurgery, but is rarely successful in isolation except in smaller AVMs. A gamma knife may also be used.

If a cerebral AVM is detected before a stroke occurs, usually the arteries feeding blood into the nidus can be closed off to avert the danger. Interventional therapy may be relatively risky in the short term.

Treatment of lung AVMs is typically performed with endovascular embolization alone, which is considered the standard of care.

== Epidemiology ==
The estimated detection rate of AVM in the US general population is 1.4/100,000 per year. This is approximately one-fifth to one-seventh the incidence of intracranial aneurysms. An estimated 300,000 Americans have AVMs, of whom 12% (approximately 36,000) will exhibit symptoms of greatly varying severity.

== History ==
Hubert von Luschka (1820–1875) and Rudolf Virchow (1821–1902) first described arteriovenous malformations in the mid-1800s. Herbert Olivecrona (1891–1980) performed the first surgical excision of an intracranial AVM in 1932.

== Society and culture ==
=== Notable cases ===
- Actor Ricardo Montalbán was born with spinal AVM. During the filming of the 1951 film Across the Wide Missouri, Montalbán was thrown from his horse, knocked unconscious, and trampled by another horse which aggravated his AVM and resulted in a painful back injury that never healed. The pain increased as he aged, and in 1993, Montalbán underwent 9 1/2 hours of spinal surgery which left him paralyzed below the waist and using a wheelchair.
- Composer and lyricist William Finn was diagnosed with AVM and underwent gamma knife surgery in September 1992, soon after he won the 1992 Tony Award for best musical, awarded to Falsettos. Finn wrote the 1998 Off-Broadway musical A New Brain about the experience.
- Phoenix Suns NBA basketball point guard AJ Price nearly died from AVM in 2004 while a student at the University of Connecticut.
- On December 13, 2006, US Senator Tim Johnson of South Dakota was diagnosed with AVM and treated at George Washington University Hospital.
- Actor/comedian T. J. Miller was diagnosed with AVM in 2010; Miller had a seizure and was unable to sleep for a period. He successfully underwent surgery that had a mortality rate of 10%.
- On August 3, 2011, Mike Patterson of the Philadelphia Eagles collapsed on the field and had a seizure during a practice, leading to him being diagnosed with AVM.
- Former Florida Gators and Oakland Raiders linebacker Neiron Ball was diagnosed with AVM in 2011 while playing for Florida, but recovered and was cleared to play. On September 16, 2018, Ball was placed in a medically induced coma due to complications of the disease, which lasted until his death on September 10, 2019.
- Indonesian actress Egidia Savitri died from complications of AVM on November 29, 2013.
- Jazz guitarist Pat Martino experienced an AVM and subsequently developed amnesia and manic depression. He eventually re-learned to play the guitar by listening to his own recordings from before the aneurysm.
- YouTube vlogger Nikki Lilly (Nikki Christou), winner of the 2016 season of Junior Bake Off was born with AVM, which has resulted in some facial disfigurement.
- Country music singer Drake White was diagnosed with AVM in January 2019, and is undergoing treatment.
- Singer-songwriter Dino Valenti (actual name Chester William Powers, Jr.) of the psychedelic rock band Quicksilver Messenger underwent brain surgery for AVM in the late 1980s.
- Model Lucy Markovic died in April 2025 at age 27 shortly after undergoing surgery to treat AVM.

== See also ==
- Foix–Alajouanine syndrome
- Haemangioma
- Klippel–Trénaunay syndrome
- Parkes Weber syndrome
