= Klippel–Trénaunay syndrome =

Klippel–Trénaunay Syndrome
- Other names: KTS or KT
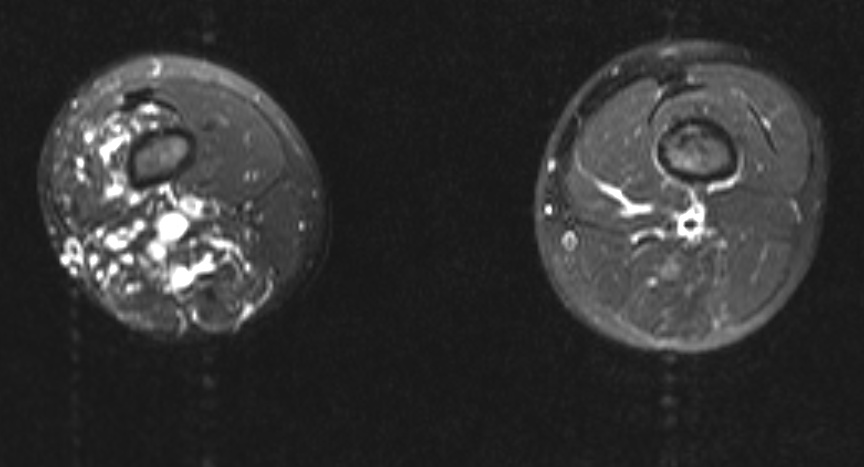
- MRI
- Specialty: Medical genetics

Klippel–Trénaunay syndrome, formerly Klippel–Trénaunay–Weber syndrome and sometimes angioosteohypertrophy syndrome and hemangiectatic hypertrophy, is a rare congenital medical condition in which blood vessels and/or lymph vessels fail to form properly. The three main features are nevus flammeus (port-wine stain), venous and lymphatic malformations, and soft-tissue hypertrophy of the affected limb. It is similar to, though distinct from, the less common Parkes Weber syndrome.

The classical triad of Klippel–Trenaunay syndrome consists of:

1. vascular malformations of the capillary, venous and lymphatic vessels;
2. varicosities of unusual distribution, particularly the lateral venous anomaly; and
3. unilateral soft and skeletal tissue hypertrophy, usually the lower extremity.

It belongs to the PIK3CA-related overgrowth spectrum of diseases which are caused by mutations in the PIK3CA gene.

== Signs and symptoms ==
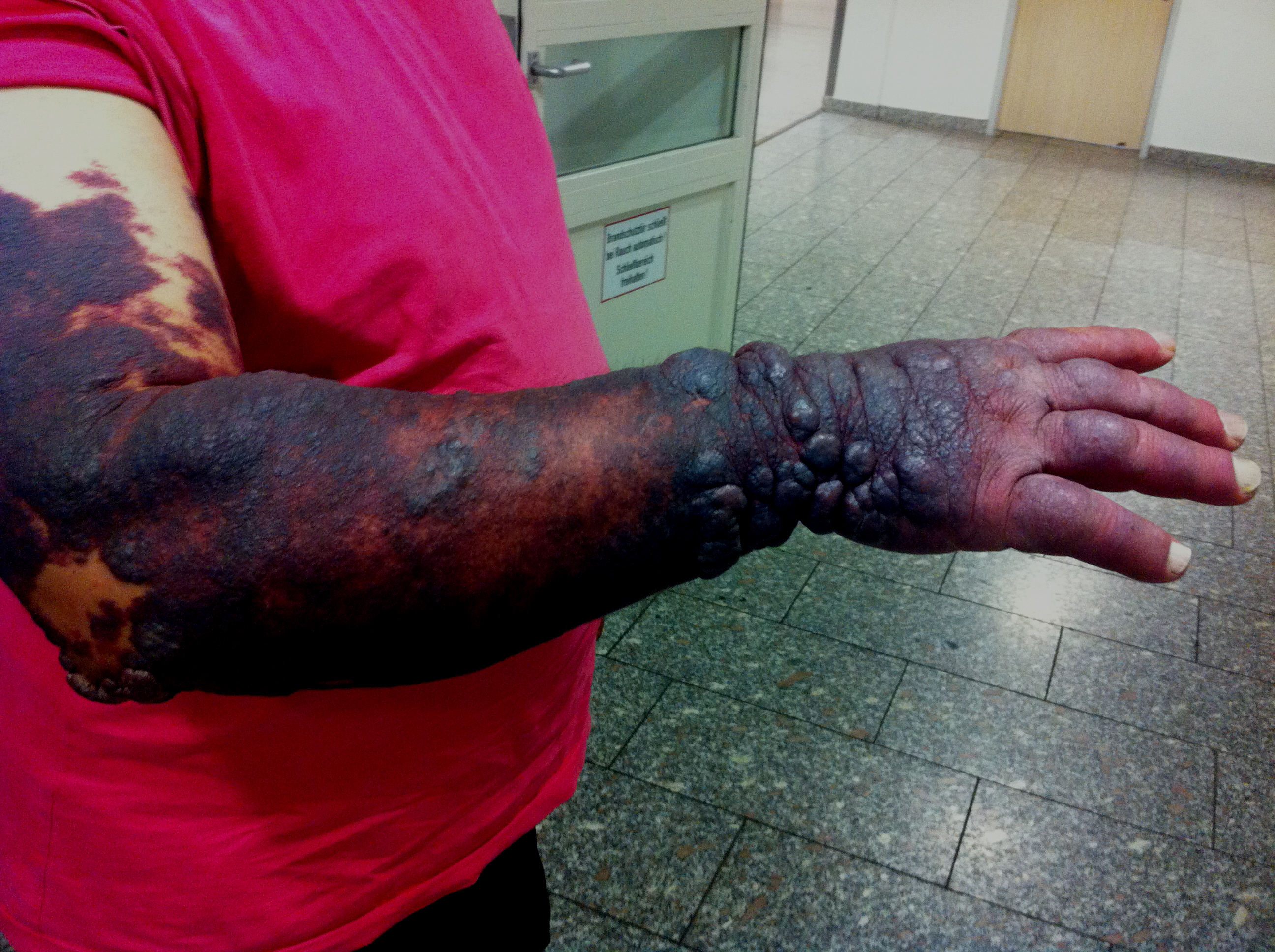
Arm of a person with KTS.

The birth defect is diagnosed by the presence of a combination of these symptoms (often on approximately 1/4 of the body, though some cases may present more or less affected tissue):

- One or more distinctive port-wine stains with sharp borders
- Varicose veins
- Hypertrophy of bony and soft tissues, that may lead to local gigantism or shrinking, most typically in the lower body/legs.
- An improperly developed lymph system

In some cases, port-wine stains (capillary port wine type) may be absent. Such cases are very rare and may be classified as "atypical Klippel–Trenaunay syndrome".

KTS can either affect blood vessels, lymph vessels, or both. The condition most commonly presents with a mixture of the two. Those with venous involvement experience increased pain and complications, such as venous ulceration in the lower extremities.

Those with large AVMs are at risk of formation of blood clots in the vascular lesion, which may migrate to the lungs (pulmonary embolism). If there is large-volume blood flow through the lesion, high-output heart failure may develop due to the inability of the heart to generate sufficient cardiac output. Much rarer are haemorrhages. They can be serious if the brain is affected.

Prevalence of symptoms
Symptom	%
Port wine stain	98%
Longer extremity/hypertrophy	67%
Circumferential hypertrophy	77%
Varicosity	72%
Pain	37%
Bleeding	17%
Superficial thrombophlebitis	15%
Cellulitis	13%
Rectal bleeding	12%
Lymphatic malformation	11%
Lymphedema	10%
Hyperpigmentation	8%
Ankle ulcers	6%
Verrucae	6%
Hyperhidrosis	5%
DVT	4%
Induration	4%
Pulmonary embolism	4%
Limb numbness	2%

== Genetics ==
The birth defect affects men and women equally, and is not limited to any racial group. In 2004, it was not certain if it was genetic in nature. As of 2001, there was evidence that it may be associated with a translocation at t(8;14)(q22.3;q13). In 2005, some researchers suggested AGGF1 has an association.

As of 2016, it belongs to the PIK3CA-related overgrowth spectrum of diseases, which are caused by mutations in the PIK3CA gene. Mutations in phosphatidylinositol-4-5-bisphosphate 3 kinase, catalytic subunit (=PIK3CA) gene leads to dysregulation of the MTOR pathway. Activation of protein kinase leads to uninhibited mTOR action resulting in cell proliferation.

== Diagnosis ==
=== Differential diagnosis ===
- Parkes Weber syndrome
- Proteus syndrome
- Macrodystrophia lipomatosa

=== Classification ===
There is disagreement as to how cases of KTS should be classified if there is an arteriovenous fistula present. Although several authorities have suggested that the term Parkes Weber syndrome is applied in those cases, ICD-10 currently uses the term "Klippel–Trénaunay–Weber syndrome".

== Treatment ==
KTS is a complex syndrome, and no single treatment is applicable for everyone. Treatment is decided on a case-by-case basis with the individual's doctors.

At present, many of the symptoms may be treated, but there is no cure for Klippel–Trenaunay syndrome.

=== Surgical ===
Debulking has been the most common treatment for KTS for several decades and while improvements have been made, the procedure is still considered invasive and has several risks associated with it. More effective and less invasive treatment choices now exist for KTS patients and therefore debulking is generally only recommended as a last resort. Debulking operations can result in major deformities and also leave patients with permanent nerve damage.

Mayo Clinic has reported the largest experience in managing KTS with major surgery. In 39 years at Mayo clinic the surgery team evaluated 252 consecutive cases of KTS, of which only 145 (57.5%) could be treated by primary surgery. The immediate success rate for treating varicose veins was only 40%, excision of vascular malformation was possible in 60%, debulking operations in 65%, and correction of bone deformity and limb length correction (epiphysiodesis) had 90% success. All the procedures demonstrated high recurrence rate in the follow-up. Mayo clinic studies demonstrate that primary surgical management of KTS has limitations and non-surgical approaches need to be developed in order to offer a better quality of life for these patients. Major surgery including amputation and debulking surgery does not seem to offer any benefit on a long-term basis.

=== Nonsurgical ===
Sclerotherapy is a treatment for specific veins and vascular malformations in the affected area. It involves the injection of a chemical into the abnormal veins to cause thickening and obstruction of the targeted vessels. Such treatment may allow normal blood flow to resume. It is a non-surgical medical procedure and is not nearly as invasive as debulking. Ultrasound guided foam sclerotherapy is the state of the art new treatment which could potentially close many large vascular malformations.

Compression therapies are finding more use as of the last ten years. The greatest issue with KTS syndrome is that the blood flow and/or lymph flow may be impeded, and will pool in the affected area. This can cause pain, swelling, inflammations, and in some cases, even ulceration and infection. Among older children and adults, compression garments can be used to alleviate almost all of these, and when combined with elevation of the affected area and proper management, can result in a comfortable lifestyle for the patient without any surgery. Compression garments are also used lately after a debulking procedure to maintain the results of the procedure. For early treatment of infants and toddlers with KTS, custom compression garments are impractical because of the rate of growth. When children may benefit from compression therapies, wraps and lymphatic massage may be used. While compression garments or therapy are not appropriate for everyone, they are relatively cheap (compared to surgery), and have few side-effects. Possible side-effects include a slight risk that the fluids may simply be displaced to an undesirable location (e.g., the groin), or that the compression therapy itself further impedes circulation to the affected extremities.

== History ==
The condition was first described by French physicians Maurice Klippel and Paul Trénaunay in 1900; they referred to it as naevus vasculosus osteohypertrophicus. The German-British physician Frederick Parkes Weber described cases in 1907 and 1918 that were similar but not identical to those described by Klippel and Trénaunay.
