= TNFSF12 =

Protein-coding gene in the species Homo sapiens

Identifiers
- Aliases: TNFSF12, APO3L, DR3LG, TWEAK, TNLG4A, tumor necrosis factor superfamily member 12, TNF superfamily member 12
- External IDs: OMIM: 602695; MGI: 1196259; GeneCards: TNFSF12
Available structures
PDB	Ortholog search: PDBe RCSB
PDB	List of PDB id codes 4HT1

Gene location (Human)
Chr.	Chromosome 17 (human)
Band	17p13.1	Start	7,549,058 bp
Band	17p13.1	End	7,557,890 bp

Gene location (Mouse)
Chr.	Chromosome 11 (mouse)
Band	11|11 B3	Start	69,577,076 bp
Band	11|11 B3	End	69,586,675 bp
RNA expression pattern
Bgee	Human / Mouse (ortholog); Top expressed in: right coronary artery; thoracic aorta; ascending aorta; Descending thoracic aorta; left coronary artery; popliteal artery; tibial arteries; gastric mucosa; muscle layer of sigmoid colon; apex of heart / Top expressed in: neural layer of retina; tunica media of zone of aorta; lip; ankle; right lung; ascending aorta; stroma of bone marrow; aortic valve; lactiferous gland; muscle of thigh; More reference expression data
BioGPS	n/a
Gene ontology
Molecular function	cytokine activity; protein binding; tumor necrosis factor receptor binding; signaling receptor binding
Cellular component	integral component of membrane; membrane; plasma membrane; integral component of plasma membrane; extracellular region; perinuclear region of cytoplasm; extracellular space
Biological process	cell differentiation; positive regulation of endothelial cell proliferation; positive regulation of protein catabolic process; extrinsic apoptotic signaling pathway; tumor necrosis factor-mediated signaling pathway; positive regulation of angiogenesis; multicellular organism development; angiogenesis; immune response; apoptotic signaling pathway; positive regulation of extrinsic apoptotic signaling pathway; endothelial cell migration; signal transduction; apoptotic process; regulation of signaling receptor activity
Sources:Amigo / QuickGO
Orthologs
Databases	NCBI: entry; OMA: entry
Species	Human	Mouse
Entrez	8742	21944
Ensembl	ENSG00000239697	ENSMUSG00000097328
UniProt	O43508	O54907
RefSeq (mRNA)	NM_003809	NM_011614
RefSeq (protein)	NP_003800	NP_035744
Location (UCSC)	Chr 17: 7.55 – 7.56 Mb	Chr 11: 69.58 – 69.59 Mb
PubMed search
- Wikidata
View/Edit Human	View/Edit Mouse

Tumor necrosis factor ligand superfamily member 12 also known as TNF-related weak inducer of apoptosis (TWEAK) is a protein that in humans is encoded by the TNFSF12 gene.

== Function ==
TWEAK was discovered in 1997. The protein encoded by this gene is a cytokine that belongs to the tumor necrosis factor (TNF) ligand family. This protein is a ligand for the FN14/TWEAKR receptor. This cytokine has overlapping signaling functions with TNF, but displays a much wider tissue distribution. Leukocytes are the main source of TWEAK including human resting and activated monocytes, dendritic cells and natural killer cells. TWEAK can induce apoptosis via multiple pathways of cell death in a cell type-specific manner. This cytokine is also found to promote proliferation and migration of endothelial cells, and thus acts as a regulator of angiogenesis.

== Clinical significance ==
Excessive activation of the TWEAK pathway in chronic injury has been described to promote pathological tissue changes including chronic inflammation, fibrosis and angiogenesis. In chronic liver disease, for example, TWEAK expression is enhanced and causes hepatic stellate cells, which are key regulators of liver fibrosis, to proliferate.
