= McKay McKinnon =

American plastic surgery physician

McKay McKinnon is an American physician specializing in plastic surgery. He works in Chicago, Illinois and Miami, Florida.

He graduated from medical school at the University of North Carolina School of Medicine. He completed his general surgery residency at Harvard University and his plastic surgery residency at the University of Miami. He completed plastic surgery fellowships at Children's Hospital in Boston, Massachusetts, University of Miami, and in Paris, France. He formerly served on the faculty at the University of Chicago Medical Center and worked at Lurie Children's Hospital in Chicago, Illinois.

== Tumor removal and craniofacial surgeries ==
In 1999, McKinnon treated a Michigan woman with a large tumor disorder, neurofibroma, at the University of Chicago. He removed her 200-pound tumor in an 18-hour operation that drew worldwide attention, according to USA Today. McKinnon was subsequently featured on the Oprah Winfrey Show for successfully removing the world’s biggest solid tumor.

In 2004, McKinnon was invited on a mission to Romania to treat a similar patient with a giant neurofibroma tumor. With a team of doctors, he performed a 10-hour operation and successfully removed an 80-pound tumor from a 47-year-old woman that suffers from a genetic disorder causing tumors to grow on her body, according to BBC News.

From 1985 to 2014 he led missions to Choluteca, Honduras where he performed cleft lip and palate and other reconstructive surgery.

In 2011, on request of US 501(c) Tree of Life International, Sam-Ottawa of Canada-based Virtual Medical Miracle Network (VM2N) connected McKinnon to Nguyen Duy Hai of Dalat Lam Dong, Vietnam, who suffered from a non-cancerous tumor weighing 198-pound (90 kg), which was growing on the right side of his abdomen. A successful 12-hour operation was performed at French Vietnam Hospital in Saigon on January 5, 2012.

In October 2012, McKinnon was featured in the television program My Giant Face Tumor on the TLC Network. In the program, he successfully removed large facial tumors from two patients, one in Ohio and the other in Thailand, who suffer from neurofibromatosis.
