= MARK2 =

Protein-coding gene in the species Homo sapiens

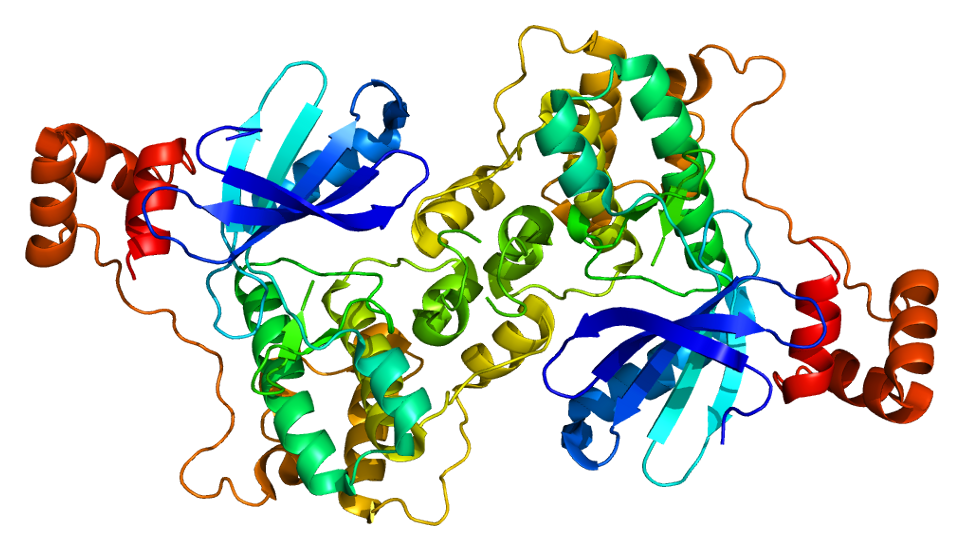

Identifiers
- Aliases: MARK2, EMK-1, EMK1, PAR-1, Par-1b, Par1b, microtubule affinity regulating kinase 2
- External IDs: OMIM: 600526; MGI: 99638; GeneCards: MARK2
Available structures
PDB	Ortholog search: PDBe RCSB
PDB	List of PDB id codes 3IEC, 5EAK
Enzyme activity
EC #	BRENDA	ExPASy	KEGG	MetaCyc
2.7.11.1	↗	↗	↗	↗
2.7.11.26	↗	↗	↗	↗

Gene location (Human)
Chr.	Chromosome 11 (human)
Band	11q13.1	Start	63,838,928 bp
Band	11q13.1	End	63,911,020 bp

Gene location (Mouse)
Chr.	Chromosome 19 (mouse)
Band	19 A|19 5.32 cM	Start	7,252,761 bp
Band	19 A|19 5.32 cM	End	7,319,225 bp
RNA expression pattern
Bgee	Human / Mouse (ortholog); Top expressed in: granulocyte; skin of abdomen; mucosa of transverse colon; skin of leg; monocyte; rectum; minor salivary glands; islet of Langerhans; right hemisphere of cerebellum; apex of heart / Top expressed in: Ileal epithelium; zygote; corneal stroma; superior surface of tongue; CA3 field; lactiferous gland; cardiac muscle tissue of left ventricle; granulocyte; plantaris muscle; secondary oocyte; More reference expression data
BioGPS	n/a
Gene ontology
Molecular function	transferase activity; nucleotide binding; protein kinase activity; protein kinase activator activity; metal ion binding; kinase activity; protein serine/threonine kinase activity; tau-protein kinase activity; protein binding; ATP binding; magnesium ion binding; lipid binding; RNA binding; cadherin binding; tau protein binding
Cellular component	microtubule bundle; cytoplasm; lateral plasma membrane; membrane; plasma membrane; mitochondrion; actin filament; cytoskeleton; nucleoplasm; dendrite; cell projection
Biological process	cell differentiation; intracellular signal transduction; phosphorylation; mitochondrion localization; neuron migration; Wnt signaling pathway; regulation of axonogenesis; multicellular organism development; protein phosphorylation; autophagy of mitochondrion; establishment or maintenance of epithelial cell apical/basal polarity; positive regulation of neuron projection development; protein autophosphorylation; peptidyl-threonine phosphorylation; activation of protein kinase activity; regulation of cytoskeleton organization; establishment of cell polarity; microtubule cytoskeleton organization; peptidyl-serine phosphorylation; axon development; regulation of microtubule cytoskeleton organization; establishment or maintenance of cell polarity regulating cell shape; regulation of microtubule binding
Sources:Amigo / QuickGO
Orthologs
Databases	NCBI: entry; OMA: entry
Species	Human	Mouse
Entrez	2011	13728
Ensembl	ENSG00000072518	ENSMUSG00000024969
UniProt	Q7KZI7	Q05512
RefSeq (mRNA)	NM_001039469; NM_001163296; NM_001163297; NM_004954; NM_017490	NM_001080388; NM_001080389; NM_001080390; NM_007928
RefSeq (protein)	NP_001034558; NP_001156768; NP_001156769; NP_004945; NP_059672	NP_001073857; NP_001073858; NP_001073859; NP_031954
Location (UCSC)	Chr 11: 63.84 – 63.91 Mb	Chr 19: 7.25 – 7.32 Mb
PubMed search
- Wikidata
View/Edit Human	View/Edit Mouse

Serine/threonine-protein kinase MARK2 is an enzyme that in humans is encoded by the MARK2 gene.

== Function ==
EMK (ELKL Motif Kinase) is a small family of ser/thr protein kinases involved in the control of cell polarity, microtubule stability and cancer. Several cDNA clones have been isolated that encoded two isoforms of the human ser/thr protein kinase EMK1. These isoforms were characterized by the presence of a 162-bp alternative exon that gave rise to two forms, one containing the exon and the other one lacking it. Both forms were found to be coexpressed in a number of selected cell lines and tissue samples. The human EMK1 was shown to be encoded by a single mRNA ubiquitously expressed.

== Interactions ==
MARK2 has been shown to interact with AKT1.
