= Macrodystrophia lipomatosa =

Macrodystrophia lipomatosa (ML) is a rare congenital disorder characterized by localised overgrowth of a part of an extremity or less commonly a whole extremity. The involvement of more than one extremity is even more uncommon. There is a slight predilection for the lower limb affection, namely the foot. The overgrown region consists predominantly of adipose tissue, but other tissue components that represent the mesenchyme may be involved.

== Clinical presentation ==
Macrodystrophia lipomatosa can manifest in functional incapacitation and esthetic problems. It is usually noticed by parents at birth or shortly after. It may be subject to an increase in size especially around puberty. The diagnosis is largely built upon establishing a comprehensive correlation between history and clinical examination on the one hand and characteristic imaging features on the other hand namely plain radiographs, ultrasound and magnetic resonance imaging (MRI) examination.

== Imaging findings ==
Plain radiographs may show bone overgrowth and deformity together with osteoarthritis changes in advanced cases. Magnetic resonance imaging has been shown to delineate the extent of abnormal fatty tissue in various sequences. It may also be used as a tool for the differential diagnosis of ML.

== Differential diagnosis ==
The differential diagnosis of macrodystrophia lipomatosa includes a wide array of disorders which result in various degrees and patterns of limb overgrowth especially those occurring in childhood and adolescence.

- Fibrolipomatous hamartoma
- Proteus syndrome
- Neurofibromatosis type 1.
- Klippel–Trénaunay syndrome.
- Parkes Weber syndrome
- Hemangiomas.

== Management ==
No medical therapy exists for such a disorder. Treatment depends upon the patient's symptomatology. Gait and functional problems may be addressed by footwear adjustments. Esthetic complaints may be addressed through plastic surgery procedures such as debulking surgery. If a significant deformity is present, a corrective osteotomy can be performed in conjugation. Digital amputation is reserved for severe deformities with or without pain.
