= AKT1 =

Protein-coding gene in humans

Identifiers
- Aliases: AKT1, AKT, CWS6, PKB, PKB-ALPHA, PRKBA, RAC, RAC-ALPHA, AKT serine/threonine kinase 1
- External IDs: OMIM: 164730; MGI: 87986; GeneCards: AKT1
Available structures
PDB	Ortholog search: PDBe RCSB
PDB	List of PDB id codes 1H10, 1UNP, 1UNQ, 1UNR, 2UVM, 2UZR, 2UZS, 3CQU, 3CQW, 3MV5, 3MVH, 3O96, 3OCB, 3OW4, 3QKK, 3QKL, 3QKM, 4EJN, 4EKK, 4EKL, 4GV1, 5KCV
Enzyme activity
EC #	BRENDA	ExPASy	KEGG	MetaCyc
2.7.11.1	↗	↗	↗	↗

Gene location (Human)
Chr.	Chromosome 14 (human)
Band	14q32.33	Start	104,769,349 bp
Band	14q32.33	End	104,795,751 bp

Gene location (Mouse)
Chr.	Chromosome 12 (mouse)
Band	12 F1|12 61.2 cM	Start	112,620,255 bp
Band	12 F1|12 61.2 cM	End	112,641,318 bp
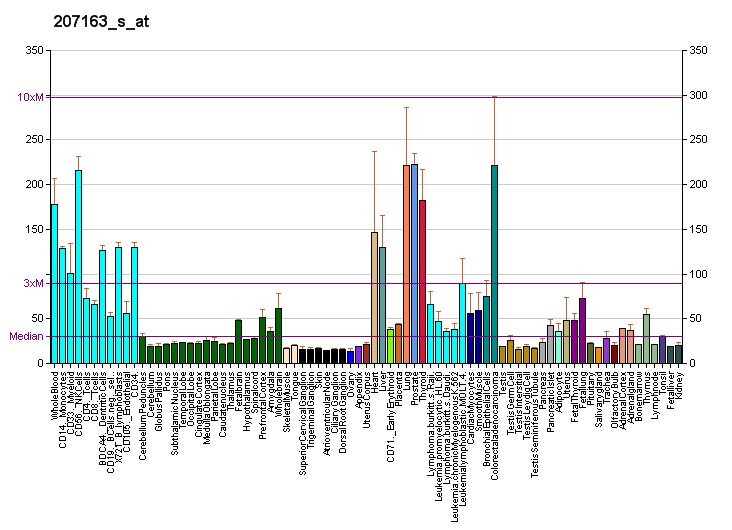
RNA expression pattern
Bgee	Human / Mouse (ortholog); Top expressed in: stromal cell of endometrium; ganglionic eminence; left adrenal cortex; right adrenal gland; right adrenal cortex; ventricular zone; right coronary artery; gallbladder; body of stomach; muscle layer of sigmoid colon / Top expressed in: ventricular zone; granulocyte; atrium; molar; human fetus; efferent ductule; endothelial cell of lymphatic vessel; submandibular gland; stroma of bone marrow; lip; More reference expression data
BioGPS	More reference expression data
Gene ontology
Molecular function	GTPase activating protein binding; kinase activity; nitric-oxide synthase regulator activity; ATP binding; protein kinase activity; protein phosphatase 2A binding; enzyme binding; phosphatidylinositol-3,4,5-trisphosphate binding; transferase activity; 14-3-3 protein binding; protein binding; protein serine/threonine/tyrosine kinase activity; protein kinase binding; protein kinase C binding; nucleotide binding; phosphatidylinositol-3,4-bisphosphate binding; identical protein binding; protein serine/threonine kinase activity; protein homodimerization activity; calmodulin binding
Cellular component	cytoplasm; cytosol; membrane; cell-cell junction; mitochondrion; nucleus; ciliary basal body; microtubule cytoskeleton; plasma membrane; spindle; nucleoplasm; vesicle; postsynapse; protein-containing complex
Biological process	germ cell development; positive regulation of glucose import; cellular response to nerve growth factor stimulus; positive regulation of protein phosphorylation; positive regulation of lipid biosynthetic process; regulation of neuron projection development; activation-induced cell death of T cells; response to heat; regulation of cell cycle checkpoint; response to organic substance; response to insulin-like growth factor stimulus; positive regulation of endodeoxyribonuclease activity; cellular response to DNA damage stimulus; regulation of protein localization; platelet activation; protein phosphorylation; cellular response to mechanical stimulus; negative regulation of long-chain fatty acid import across plasma membrane; negative regulation of fatty acid beta-oxidation; cell projection organization; cellular response to granulocyte macrophage colony-stimulating factor stimulus; positive regulation of blood vessel endothelial cell migration; glucose metabolic process; glycogen metabolic process; regulation of glycogen biosynthetic process; glycogen cell differentiation involved in embryonic placenta development; cell population proliferation; negative regulation of autophagy; cellular response to hypoxia; negative regulation of cell size; endocrine pancreas development; carbohydrate transport; negative regulation of proteolysis; insulin-like growth factor receptor signaling pathway; positive regulation of protein metabolic process; positive regulation of glycogen biosynthetic process; glucose homeostasis; labyrinthine layer blood vessel development; response to oxidative stress; negative regulation of gene expression; positive regulation of peptidyl-serine phosphorylation; cellular response to prostaglandin E stimulus; positive regulation of cell growth; positive regulation of nitric-oxide synthase activity; maternal placenta development; regulation of myelination; protein ubiquitination; positive regulation of vasoconstriction; hyaluronan metabolic process; spinal cord development; cellular response to insulin stimulus; cellular response to decreased oxygen levels; protein autophosphorylation; inflammatory response; positive regulation of fat cell differentiation; positive regulation of proteasomal ubiquitin-dependent protein catabolic process; negative regulation of neuron death; G protein-coupled receptor signaling pathway; cell differentiation; cellular response to peptide; negative regulation of protein kinase activity; phosphorylation; regulation of mRNA stability; negative regulation of release of cytochrome c from mitochondria; execution phase of apoptosis; cellular response to organic cyclic compound; positive regulation of DNA-binding transcription factor activity; positive regulation of glucose metabolic process; nervous system development; response to fluid shear stress; maintenance of protein location in mitochondrion; protein catabolic process; negative regulation of protein kinase activity by protein phosphorylation; osteoblast differentiation; response to UV-A; response to hormone; peptidyl-threonine phosphorylation; lipopolysaccharide-mediated signaling pathway; positive regulation of protein localization to nucleus; negative regulation of cysteine-type endopeptidase activity involved in apoptotic process; intracellular signal transduction; regulation of cell migration; peripheral nervous system myelin maintenance; nitric oxide biosynthetic process; positive regulation of endothelial cell proliferation; protein biosynthesis; positive regulation of nitric oxide biosynthetic process; cellular response to growth factor stimulus; T cell costimulation; regulation of nitric-oxide synthase activity; ageing; mammary gland epithelial cell differentiation; cellular response to epidermal growth factor stimulus; multicellular organism development; negative regulation of JNK cascade; glycogen biosynthetic process; establishment of protein localization to mitochondrion; apoptotic mitochondrial changes; peptidyl-serine phosphorylation; positive regulation of sodium ion transport; response to growth hormone; positive regulation of apoptotic process; response to food; cellular response to vascular endothelial growth factor stimulus; striated muscle cell differentiation; negative regulation of oxidative stress-induced intrinsic apoptotic signaling pathway; negative regulation of extrinsic apoptotic signaling pathway in absence of ligand; positive regulation of fibroblast migration; regulation of translation; positive regulation of transcription by RNA polymerase II; signal transduction; negative regulation of endopeptidase activity; apoptotic process; positive regulation of epidermal growth factor receptor signaling pathway; interleukin-18-mediated signaling pathway; insulin receptor signaling pathway; positive regulation of smooth muscle cell proliferation; regulation of signal transduction by p53 class mediator; negative regulation of macroautophagy; TOR signaling; anoikis; positive regulation of organ growth; I-kappaB kinase/NF-kappaB signaling; phosphatidylinositol 3-kinase signaling; cellular response to reactive oxygen species; NIK/NF-kappaB signaling; positive regulation of transcription, DNA-templated; cellular response to cadmium ion; positive regulation of I-kappaB phosphorylation; epidermal growth factor receptor signaling pathway; positive regulation of cell population proliferation; positive regulation of mitochondrial membrane potential; regulation of apoptotic process; negative regulation of apoptotic process; positive regulation of protein localization to plasma membrane; carbohydrate metabolic process; activation of protein kinase B activity; protein kinase B signaling; negative regulation of protein kinase B signaling; excitatory postsynaptic potential; cellular response to tumor necrosis factor; cell migration involved in sprouting angiogenesis; positive regulation of gene expression; cytokine-mediated signaling pathway; negative regulation of protein ubiquitination; negative regulation of protein binding; positive regulation of cyclin-dependent protein serine/threonine kinase activity; negative regulation of Notch signaling pathway; negative regulation of protein serine/threonine kinase activity; cellular response to oxidised low-density lipoprotein particle stimulus; positive regulation of G1/S transition of mitotic cell cycle; negative regulation of leukocyte cell-cell adhesion; positive regulation of protein localization to cell surface; negative regulation of lymphocyte migration; protein import into nucleus
Sources:Amigo / QuickGO
Orthologs
Databases	NCBI: entry; OMA: entry
Species	Human	Mouse
Entrez	207	11651
Ensembl	ENSG00000142208	ENSMUSG00000001729
UniProt	P31749	P31750
RefSeq (mRNA)	NM_001014431; NM_001014432; NM_005163; NM_001382430; NM_001382431 NM_001382432; NM_001382433	NM_001165894; NM_009652; NM_001331107
RefSeq (protein)	NP_001014431; NP_001014432; NP_005154; NP_001369359; NP_001369360 NP_001369361; NP_001369362	NP_001159366; NP_001318036; NP_033782
Location (UCSC)	Chr 14: 104.77 – 104.8 Mb	Chr 12: 112.62 – 112.64 Mb
PubMed search
- Wikidata
View/Edit Human	View/Edit Mouse

RAC(Rho family)-alpha serine/threonine-protein kinase is an enzyme that in humans is encoded by the AKT1 gene. This enzyme belongs to the AKT subfamily of serine/threonine kinases that contain SH2 (Src homology 2-like) protein domains. It is commonly referred to as PKB, or by both names as "Akt/PKB".

== Function ==
The serine-threonine protein kinase AKT1 is catalytically inactive in serum-starved primary and immortalized fibroblasts. AKT1 and the related AKT2 are activated by platelet-derived growth factor. The activation is rapid and specific, and it is abrogated by mutations in the pleckstrin homology domain of AKT1. It was shown that the activation occurs through phosphatidylinositol 3-kinase. In the developing nervous system AKT is a critical mediator of growth factor-induced neuronal survival. Survival factors can suppress apoptosis in a transcription-independent manner by activating the serine/threonine kinase AKT1, which then phosphorylates and inactivates components of the apoptotic machinery. Mice lacking Akt1 display a 25% reduction in body mass, indicating that Akt1 is critical for transmitting growth-promoting signals, most likely via the IGF1 receptor. Mice lacking Akt1 are also resistant to cancer: They experience considerable delay in tumor growth initiated by the large T antigen or the Neu oncogene. A single-nucleotide polymorphism in this gene causes Proteus syndrome.

== History ==
AKT (now also called AKT1) was originally identified as the oncogene in the transforming retrovirus, AKT8. AKT8 was isolated from a spontaneous thymoma cell line derived from AKR mice by cocultivation with an indicator mink cell line. The transforming cellular sequences, v-akt, were cloned from a transformed mink cell clone and these sequences were used to identify Akt1 and Akt2 in a human clone library. AKT8 was isolated by Stephen Staal in the laboratory of Wallace P. Rowe; he subsequently cloned v-akt and human AKT1 and AKT2 while on staff at the Johns Hopkins Oncology Center.

In 2011, a mutation in AKT1 was strongly associated with Proteus syndrome, the disease that probably affected the Elephant Man.

The name Akt stands for Ak strain transforming. The origins of the Akt name date back to 1928, when J. Furth performed experimental studies on mice that developed spontaneous thymic lymphomas. Mice from three different stocks were studied, and the stocks were designated A, R, and S. Stock A was noted to yield many cancers, and inbred families were subsequently designated by a second small letter (Aa, Ab, Ac, etc.), and thus came the Ak strain of mice. Further inbreeding was undertaken with Ak mice at the Rockefeller Institute in 1936, leading to the designation of the AKR mouse strain. In 1977, a transforming retrovirus was isolated from the AKR mouse. This virus was named Akt-8, the "t" representing its transforming capabilities.

== Interactions ==
AKT1 has been shown to interact with:

- AKTIP,
- BRAF,
- BRCA1,
- C-Raf,
- CDKN1B,
- CHUK
- GAB2,
- HSP90AA1,
- ILK,
- KRT10,
- MAP2K4,
- MAP3K11,
- MAP3K8,
- MAPK14,
- MAPKAPK2,
- MARK2,
- MTCP1,
- MTOR,
- NPM1,
- NR4A1,
- NR3C4,
- PKN2,
- PRKCQ,
- PDPK1,
- PLXNA1,
- TCL1A,
- TRIB3,
- TSC1,
- TSC2, and
- YWHAZ.

== See also ==
- AKT – the AKT family of proteins
- AKT2 – the gene for the second member of the AKT family
- AKT3 – the gene for the third member of the AKT family
- Proteus syndrome
