= Maurice Klippel =

French physician (1858–1942)

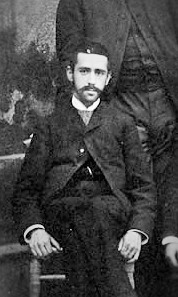
- Klippel in 1886
- Born: 30 May 1858; Mulhouse, Haut-Rhin, France
- Died: 20 July 1942 (aged 84)
- Occupation: Physician
- Known for: Describing Klippel–Feil syndrome and Klippel–Trénaunay–Weber syndrome

Maurice Klippel (30 May 1858 – 20 July 1942) was a French physician, for whom the conditions Klippel–Feil syndrome and Klippel–Trénaunay–Weber syndrome are named.

He was born in Mulhouse, Haut-Rhin and studied medicine in Paris, earning his doctorate in 1889. In 1902, he became director of a department of general medicine at the Hôpital Tenon, where he remained until his retirement in 1924.

He published articles on a wide array of medical topics, his best known written works being in the fields of neurology and psychiatry. His treatises on cerebral syphilis, tumors and abscesses were published in Brouardel and Gilbert's Traité de médecine (1901).
