= Dede =

DeDe, De De, Dedé or Dédé may refer to:

== People ==
=== Nickname or stage name ===
==== Association football ====
- Dedé (footballer, born 1981), Angolan, born Adérito Waldemar Alves Carvalho, mostly played for Portuguese clubs
- Dedé (footballer, born 1978), Brazilian, born Leonardo de Deus Santos, mostly played for Dortmund
- Dedé (footballer, born 1987), Brazilian, born Derivaldo Beserra Cavalcante, played for a large number of Brazilian clubs
- Dedé (footballer, born 1988), Brazilian, born Anderson Vital da Silva, mostly played for Vasco da Gama and Cruzeiro
- Dedé (footballer, born 2002), Brazilian, born Vitor Hugo Oliveira Corrêa da Silva, plays for CSA
- Didier Deschamps (born 1968), French, played for prominent European clubs and France, manager of France since 2012

==== Other fields ====
- Dede Allen (1923–2010), American film editor
- Dede Barry (born 1972), American cycle racer
- Dédé Fortin (1962–2000), Canadian musician
- DeDe Lattimore (born 1991), American football player
- DeDe Lind (born 1947), American model and Playboy Playmate of the Month
- Denise Lopez (Swedish singer), Mexican-born Swedish singer
- De De Pierce (1904–1973), American jazz trumpeter and cornetist
- Dede Robertson (1927–2022), Evangelical Christian activist
- Dedé Santana (born 1936), Brazilian comedian
- Dede Westbrook (born 1993), American football player
- Dede Wilsey (born 1944), American philanthropist

=== Given name ===
- Dede Alpert (born 1945), American politician
- Dedé Anderson (born 1980), Brazilian footballer
- Dede Barry (born 1972), American cycle racer
- Dédé Rose Creppy, Togolese businesswoman
- Dede Dolopei, Liberian civil servant
- DeDe Dorsey (born 1984), American football player
- Dede Feldman (born 1947), American politician
- Dede Koswara (1971–2016), Indonesian carpenter afflicted with a rare disease that led to warts all over his body
- Dédé Saint Prix (born 1953), Martinican singer
- Dede Indra Permana Soediro (born 1982), Indonesian politician

=== Pseudonym ===
- Dede (artist), Israeli graffiti artist

=== Surname ===
- Ahmet Kayhan Dede, Turkish Sufi master
- Çiğdem Dede (born 1980), Turkish paralympic powerlifter
- Edmond Dédé (1827–1901), American composer/conductor active in France
- Hammamizade İsmail Dede Efendi (1778–1846), Turkish composer
- Klaus Dede (1935–2018), German writer and journalist
- Mercan Dede (born 1966), Turkish composer and musician
- Munejjim-bashi Ahmed Dede, Turkish astronomer

== Arts and entertainment ==
- Dédé (opérette), a 1921 operetta by Henri Christiné
- Dédé (1935 film), French comedy film directed by René Guissart
- Dédé (1989 film), a French film by Jean-Louis Benoît
- Dede (2017 film), a Georgian film by Mariam Khatchvani
- Dede Franklin, a Prison Break character
- the title character of the Book of Dede Korkut, an epic story of the Oghuz Turks
- Dede (band), American dream pop/post-rock band

== Other uses ==
- Dede (religious figure), in Alevi or Bektashi
- Dede (restaurant), in Baltimore, Ireland
- Yakan movement, also called Dede

== See also ==
- Deedee
- Deede (disambiguation)
- Dedee, a nickname
- Dedede, a character in the Kirby video game franchise
- DD (disambiguation)
- Didi (disambiguation)
