= Kayhan (disambiguation) =

Kayhan is an Iranian newspaper.

Kayhan may also refer to:

== Given name ==
- Kayhan Kalhor, Iranian-Kurdish musician
- Kayhan Kaynak, Turkish footballer

== Surname ==
- Ahmet Kayhan Dede, Turkish Sufi
- Kemal Kayhan, Turkish volleyball player
- Khalid Kayhan, Afghan musician
- Tanju Kayhan, Austrian footballer

== Businesses and organizations ==
- Kayhan Space, an American aerospace software company
