= DD =

DD, dd, or other variants may refer to:

== Arts and entertainment ==
=== Film and television ===
- DD National or DD1, an Indian national television channel
- Dhivyadharshini, Indian television host and actress, known as DD
- Matt Murdock (Marvel Cinematic Universe), a counterpart to the Daredevil comic book character
- Doordarshan, a public service broadcaster in India
- The Tenth Planet, a 1966 Doctor Who serial (production code "DD")
- Dhilluku Dhuddu franchise, Indian film series
  - Dhilluku Dhuddu (2016), the first instalment in the Dhilluku Dhuddu series
- Edd, commonly known as Double-D, a character from Ed, Edd n Eddy

=== Music ===
- "D.D.", track from the mixtape Echoes of Silence by the Weeknd
- Dancing Dolls, a Japanese all-female pop group
- Erann DD, a Danish singer and songwriter
- "Double D'z" (2022), a song by Black Eyed Peas from Elevation

=== Other media ===
- DD (character), in The Saga of Seven Suns novels by Kevin J. Anderson
- Daredevil (Marvel Comics character)
- Decorative Designers, an artists firm
- Donegal Daily, an Irish news website
- D&D (Dungeons & Dragons), a fantasy tabletop role-playing game

== Businesses ==
- Daniel Defense, a firearms manufacturer
- Data Disc
- Decorative Designers, an artists firm
- Dioničko društvo (d.d. or D.D.), a type of Joint-stock company in Bosnian and Croatian languages
- Doordarshan, a public service broadcaster in India
- DuPont, which trades shares on the New York Stock Exchange as DD
- Dunkin' Donuts, a coffee and doughnut company

== Military ==
- DD tank, an amphibious tank
- Dishonorable discharge, a punitive discharge in the U.S. military
- DD, the U.S. Navy hull classification for destroyers
- DD Form 214, a form used by the U.S. Defense Department

== Places ==
- DD postcode area, in Scotland
- Daman and Diu, a former union territory of India, now part of Dadra and Nagar Haveli and Daman and Diu
- Dresden, Germany (license plate code DD)
- German Democratic Republic (hypothetical domain name .dd)
- South Sulawesi (vehicle registration prefix DD)

== Science and technology ==
=== Computing ===
- <dd></dd>, an HTML element for specifying definition data
- dd (Unix), a program that copies and converts files and data
- .dd, a hypothetical domain name for the German Democratic Republic
- Deckadance, a DJ program for Windows and Mac OS X designed by Image-Line
- Deployment descriptor, a component in Java Platform, Enterprise Edition applications
- Logo for Dolby Digital, audio compression technologies developed by Dolby Laboratories
- Double density, a capacity designation on magnetic storage, usually floppy disks
- Debian Developer, the traditional full-membership role in Debian

=== Other uses in science and technology ===
- Data deficient, a rating on the IUCN Red List of Threatened Species
- Decimal degrees, geographic coordinates shown using decimal fractions
- Death domain, a protein-interaction module, a subclass of the death fold protein motif
- DD Index, for Democracy-Dictatorship Index
- Abbreviation for dolichospondylic dysplasia, a genetic syndrome
- Developmental disability, or developmentally disabled, a diverse group of chronic conditions due to mental or physical impairments arising before adulthood
- Deuterium-deuterium fusion, a type of nuclear fusion

== Sport ==
- Degree of difficulty, in several sports
- Delhi Daredevils, former name of Delhi Capitals
- Delhi Dynamos FC, an Indian Super League franchise, now Odisha FC

== Transportation ==
- DD tank, an amphibious tank
- D-D locomotive, the AAR classification for a railway locomotive with two four-axle bogies
- Danish Air Lines, former airline (IATA code DD)
- Invincible D-D, a prototype aircraft
- Nok Air, a low-cost airline based in Thailand
- Victorian Railways Dd class, a class of steam locomotives in Australia
- South Sulawesi (vehicle registration prefix DD)

== Other uses ==
- DD, a brassiere measurement
- Dd (digraph), in the Welsh language
- Demand draft, a negotiable instrument issued by the bank
- Deputy Director (disambiguation), a rank in some organizations
- Designated driver, a person who remains sober as the responsible driver
- Doctor of Divinity, an academic degree
- Dompet Dhuafa, an Indonesian charity
- Dine and dash, a form of theft by fraud
- Direct debit, a way of paying bills
- Double Diamond Burton Pale Ale

== See also ==
- Dede (disambiguation)
- Dedee, a nickname
- Deede (disambiguation)
- Deedee (disambiguation)
- Didi (disambiguation)
