= Dutty =

Dutty is a given name. Notable people with the name include:

- Dutty Boukman (died 1791), early Haitian Revolution leader
- Dutty Dior (1996–2024), Norwegian hip hop artist

== See also ==
- Ditty
- Dutty Rock
- "Dutty Wine"
- "Dutty Love"
