= Didi =

Didi may refer to:

== Arts and entertainment ==
- "Didi" (song), a song by Khaled
- Vladimir (Waiting for Godot), nicknamed Didi, a character in Samuel Beckett's play
- Didi, the principal character in Didi's Comedy Show, a German comedy television show
- Didi Pickles, mother of Tommy and Dil in the cartoons Rugrats and All Grown Up!
- Dìdi, a 2024 film by Sean Wang

== People ==
- Didi (footballer, born 1928), Brazilian footballer Waldyr Pereira (1928–2001)
- Didi (footballer, born 1963), Brazilian women's football goalkeeper Diedja Maglione Roque Barreto
- Didi (footballer, born 1976), Brazilian football striker Sebastião Pereira do Nascimento
- Didi (footballer, born 1982), Brazilian football striker Cleidimar Magalhães Silva
- Didi (footballer, born 1985), Spanish football winger Didac Rodríguez González
- Didi (footballer, born 1991), Brazilian football defender Vinicius José Ignácio
- Didi (footballer, born 1994), Portuguese football midfielder José Diogo Macedo da Silva
- Didi (Angolan footballer), Angolan international player 1999–2001
- Renato Aragão (born 1935), Brazilian humorist also known as Didi
- Mamata Banerjee (born 1955), nicknamed Didi, chief minister of West Bengal, India
- Didi B (born 1992), Ivorian musician
- Didi Benami (born 1986), American singer/songwriter
- Didi Carli (born 1943), Argentinian ballet dancer
- Didier Casnati (born 1980), Italian musician, singer, guitarist, and songwriter nicknamed Didi
- Didi Conn (born 1951), American actress
- Didi Contractor (1929–2021), German-American architect
- Didi Gregorius (born 1990), Dutch baseball player
- Didi Kempot (1966–2020), Indonesian singer
- Didi Louzada (born 1999), Brazilian basketball player
- Didi Petet (1956–2015), Indonesian actor
- Dietmar Hamann (born 1973), German footballer
- Dietmar Kühbauer (born 1971), Austrian footballer
- DiDi Richards (born 1999), American basketball player
- Diego Santos (born 1987), Brazilian footballer also known as Didi
- Didi Senft (born 1952), also known as "Didi the Devil", colorful spectator of cycle races
- Évelyne Didi, French actress
- Ibrahim Didi (fl. 2008–2010), Maldivian politician

== Other uses ==
- DiDi, a Chinese vehicle for hire company
- Didi, Iran, a village in Kerman Province

== See also ==
- Dee Dee (disambiguation)
- DD (disambiguation)
- Diddy (disambiguation)
- Mej Didi (disambiguation)
