= Emma Thayer =

Emma Thayer may refer to:

- Emma Homan Thayer, American botanical artist and author of books about native wildflowers
- Emma Beach Thayer, American artist
- Emma Redington Thayer, pseudonym Lee Thayer, American artist and author of mystery novels
