= Deede =

Deede may refer to:

- USS Deede, USN ships by the name "Deede"
  - USS Deede (DE-263), Evarts-class destroyer escort
- LeRoy Clifford Deede, USN DFC recipient

Deede is also a word in Khana language of the Ogoni people of Rivers State of Nigeria used to refer to an uncle.

== See also ==
- DD (disambiguation)
- Dede (disambiguation)
- Dedee, a nickname
- Deedee
