= Mej Didi =

Mej Didi (lit. 'Miss Sister') may refer to these Indian films:

- Mej Didi (1950 film), a 1950 Bengali film
- Mej Didi (2003 film), a 2003 Bengali film

== See also ==
- Mej (disambiguation)
- Didi (disambiguation)
