= TMC6 =

Protein-coding gene in the species Homo sapiens

Identifiers
- Aliases: TMC6, EV1, EVER1, EVIN1, LAK-4P, transmembrane channel like 6, TNRC6C-AS1, lnc
- External IDs: OMIM: 605828; MGI: 1098686; GeneCards: TMC6

Gene location (Human)
Chr.	Chromosome 17 (human)
Band	17q25.3	Start	78,107,397 bp
Band	17q25.3	End	78,132,407 bp

Gene location (Mouse)
Chr.	Chromosome 11 (mouse)
Band	11 E2|11 82.96 cM	Start	117,656,814 bp
Band	11 E2|11 82.96 cM	End	117,673,024 bp
RNA expression pattern
Bgee	Human / Mouse (ortholog); Top expressed in: granulocyte; C1 segment; lymph node; spleen; apex of heart; sural nerve; upper lobe of left lung; mucosa of transverse colon; buccal mucosa cell; appendix / Top expressed in: granulocyte; thymus; blood; otic placode; mesenteric lymph nodes; lumbar spinal ganglion; saccule; lip; tibiofemoral joint; Ileal epithelium; More reference expression data
BioGPS	n/a
Gene ontology
Molecular function	protein binding; ion channel activity; mechanosensitive ion channel activity
Cellular component	cytoplasm; integral component of membrane; Golgi apparatus; nuclear membrane; extracellular exosome; endoplasmic reticulum membrane; endoplasmic reticulum; membrane; plasma membrane; specific granule membrane; tertiary granule membrane; integral component of plasma membrane
Biological process	ion transport; neutrophil degranulation; transport; biological process; ion transmembrane transport; transmembrane transport
Sources:Amigo / QuickGO
Orthologs
Databases	NCBI: entry; OMA: entry
Species	Human	Mouse
Entrez	11322	217353
Ensembl	ENSG00000141524	ENSMUSG00000025572
UniProt	Q7Z403	Q7TN60
RefSeq (mRNA)	NM_001127198; NM_007267; NM_001321185; NM_001374593; NM_001374594 NM_001375353; NM_001375354; NM_001374596	NM_145439; NM_181321
RefSeq (protein)	NP_001120670; NP_001308114; NP_009198; NP_001361522; NP_001361523 NP_001362282; NP_001362283; NP_001361525	NP_663414
Location (UCSC)	Chr 17: 78.11 – 78.13 Mb	Chr 11: 117.66 – 117.67 Mb
PubMed search
- Wikidata
View/Edit Human	View/Edit Mouse

Transmembrane channel-like protein 6 is a protein that in humans is encoded by the TMC6 gene. In vivo, TMC6 and its homolog TMC8, interact and form a complex with the zinc transporter 1 (SLC30A1) and localize mostly to the endoplasmic reticulum, but also to the nuclear membrane and Golgi apparatus.

Inactivating mutations in TMC6 or TMC8 have been implicated as the genetic cause of the rare skin disorder epidermodysplasia verruciformis, which is characterized by abnormal susceptibility to human papillomaviruses (HPVs) of the skin resulting in the growth of scaly macules and papules, particularly on the hands and feet.
