= Henry Bayman =

Turkish scholar

Henry Bayman is an independent scholar living in Turkey who has spent twenty-five years studying with the Masters of Wisdom of Central Anatolia. He is the author of The Station of No Station, a study of Sufism and Islam as they relate to contemporary issues, The Secret of Islam: Love and Law in the Religion of Ethics, The Black Pearl: Spiritual Illumination In Sufism And East Asian Philosophies & The Teachings of a Perfect Master: An Islamic Saint for the Third Millennium.

Henry Bayman introduced through his writings, one of his spiritual teacher in the Sufi Path, Ahmet Kayhan (1898 - August 3, 1998) whom he calls "Grand Master of Sufism." According to his own account, Henry Bayman met Ahmet Kayhan in early spring, 1978 and after the introduction he began to attend his discussion groups more frequently. From the beginning of September 1983, excluding normal working hours or vacations, he stayed almost continually in the presence of Ahmet Kayhan until his death.

== Published works ==
Till January 2012, Henry Bayman has authored 4 Books and a number of articles.

- 2001 The Station of No Station: Open Secrets of the Sufis. North Atlantic Books. ISBN 1556432402
- 2003 The Secret of Islam: Love and Law in the Religion of Ethics. North Atlantic Books. ISBN 1556434324
- 2005 The Black Pearl: Spiritual Illumination In Sufism and East Asian Philosophies. Monkfish Book Publishing. ISBN 0974935956
- 2012 The Teachings of a Perfect Master: An Islamic Saint for the Third Millennium. Anqa Publishing. ISBN 190593744X

== Online books ==
- The Meaning of the Four Books
- Science, Knowledge and Sufism

Both the online books are made available in online readable version on HenryBayman.com
