= Diddy (disambiguation) =

Diddy (Sean Combs, born 1969) is an American rapper, producer, and convicted sex offender.

Diddy may also refer to:

- "Diddy" (song), a 2001 song by P. Diddy
- Diddy David (born 1938), a nickname of British broadcaster David Hamilton
- Diddy Kong, a fictional Nintendo character
- Diddy (DJ) (born 1966), British DJ known for the 1997 single "Give Me Love"
- Diddy Men, fictitious dwarves popularised by British comedian Ken Dodd
- Diddy Dick and Dom, a comedy duo portrayed by Richard McCourt and Dominic Wood
  - Diddy Movies, a CBBC show running from 2012 to 2014
  - Diddy TV, a sequel to Diddy Movies that has aired since 2016

== See also ==
- "Diddy Wah Diddy", a 1956 song written by Willie Dixon and Bo Diddley
- "Do Wah Diddy Diddy", a 1963 song first recorded by the Exciters and popularized by Manfred Mann
- Didi (disambiguation)
- Ditty (disambiguation)
