= Charles Buckles Falls =

American artist and writer

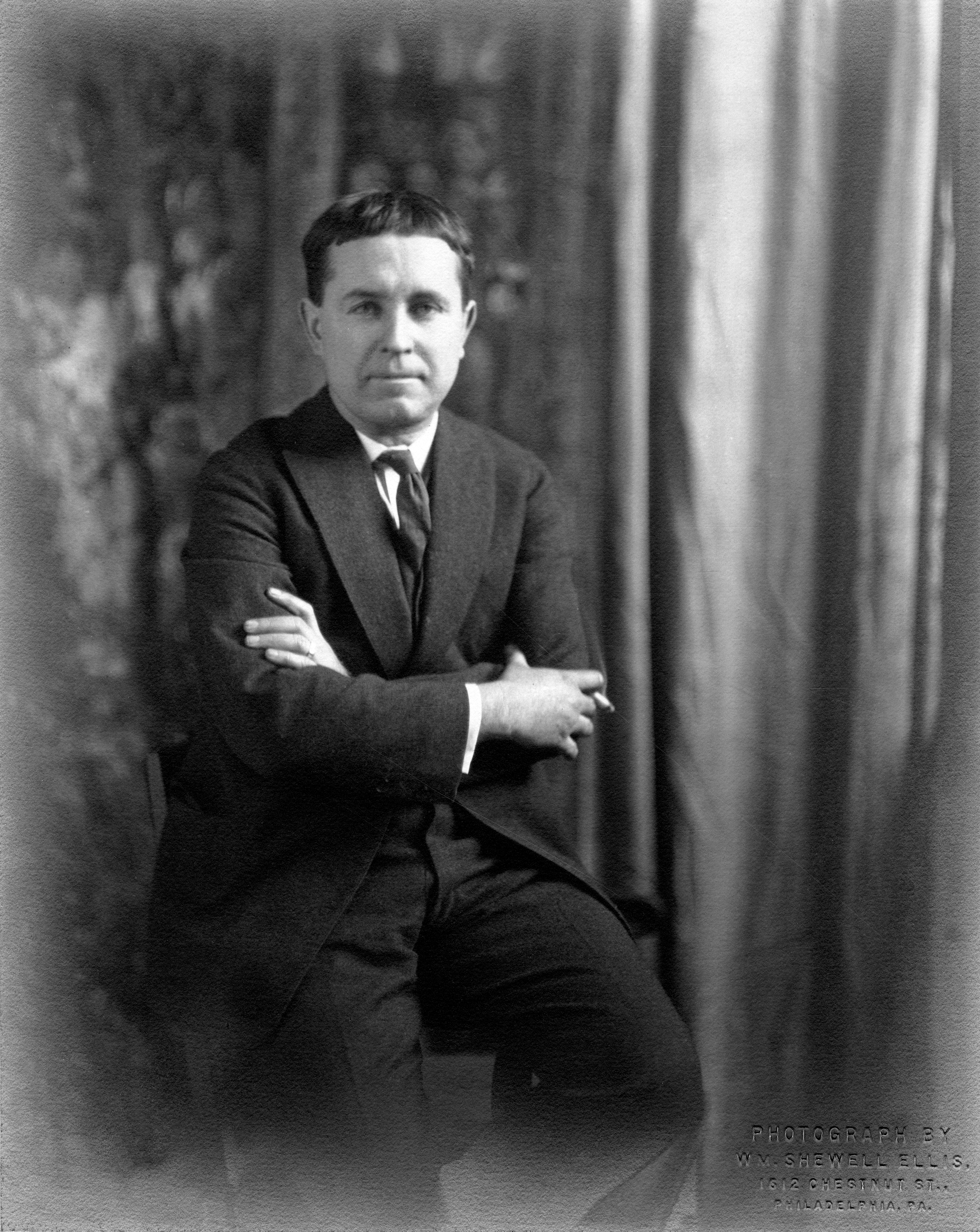
- C. B. Falls in 1918
- Born: December 10, 1874; Fort Wayne, Indiana
- Died: April 15, 1960 (aged 85); New York City, New York
- Known for: Drawing, painting, writing, advertising, stage design
- Awards: The Benjamin West Clinedinst Memorial Medal

Charles Buckles Falls, also known as C. B. Falls (December 10, 1874 – April 15, 1960), was an American artist and member of the Decorative Designers, most known for his illustrations and writings. He is the author and illustrator of several books, including The ABC Book. He is also known for his World War I poster advertisements, such as Books Wanted.

== Biography ==
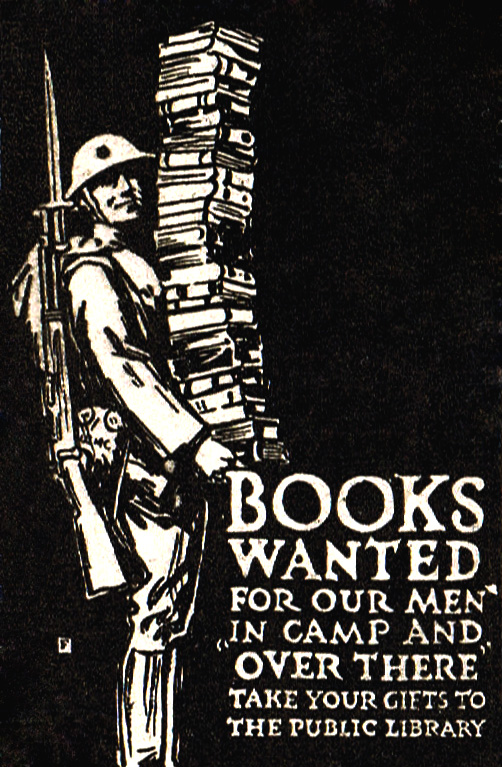
Falls illustration for the "Books Wanted" campaign (Harper's Magazine, November 1918)

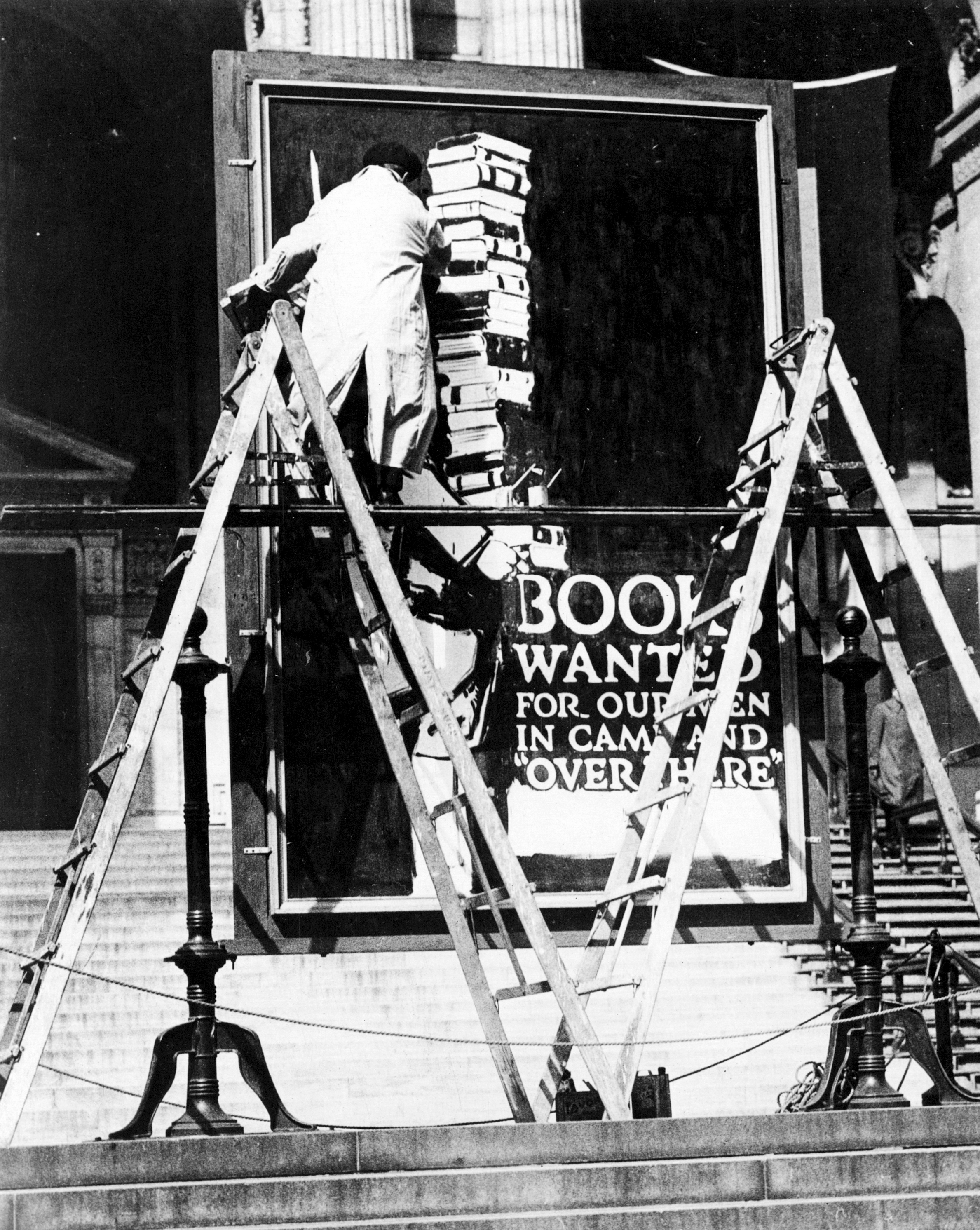
Falls painting a 15-foot poster for the "Books Wanted" campaign at the New York Public Library (March 1918)

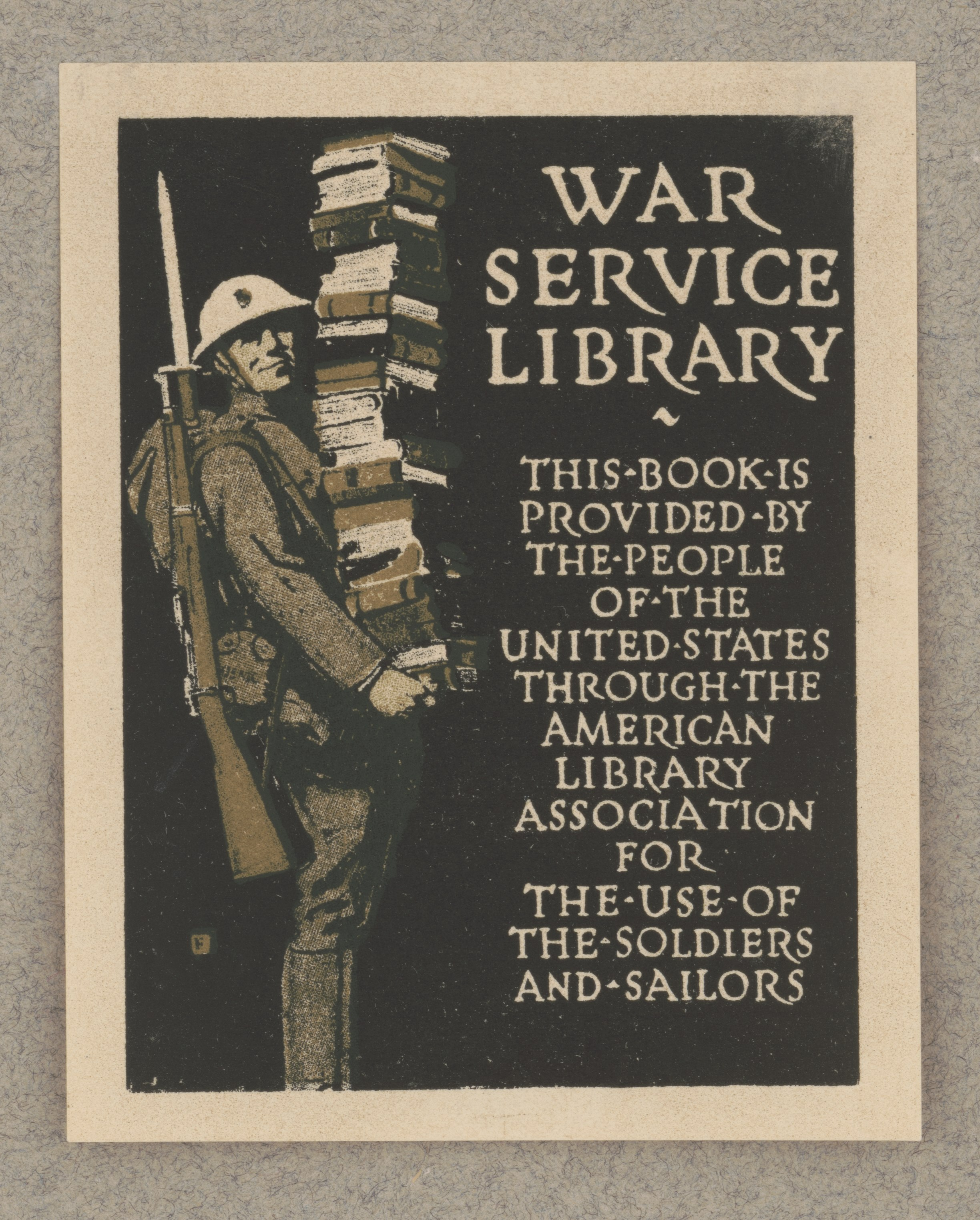
Bookplate for the "Books Wanted" campaign

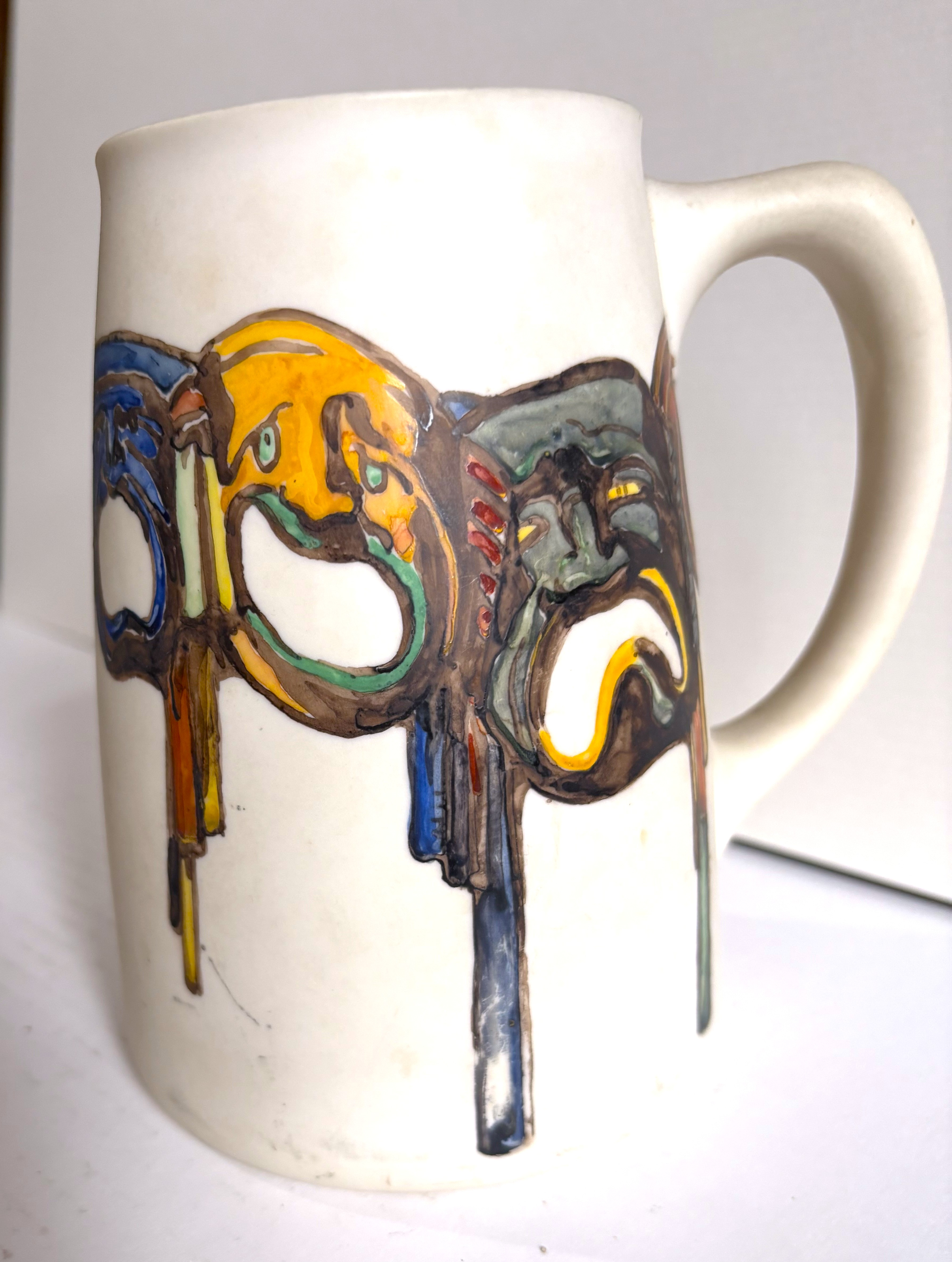
1914 Number 16 Masks

Charles Buckles Falls was born on December 10, 1874, in Fort Wayne, Indiana. In his early twenties he moved to Chicago, where he began his career as an architect's assistant and as a sketch artist for the Chicago Tribune. While working as an architect's assistant, he taught himself how to draft and ultimately became a freelance artist. Unhappy with his salary, Falls left the Chicago Tribune and moved to New York City around 1900. While in New York, he struggled to find work until he met the artist and author Joseph Pennell.

== Career ==
Falls illustrated many different books for various authors, as well as various magazines and posters. During World War I, he was a member of the Society of Illustrators, with whom he produced war propaganda for the Committee on Public Information's Division of Pictorial Publicity. Falls illustrated posters throughout the war that promoted military recruitment as well as book drives to benefit soldiers overseas. This latter effort can be seen in his poster Books Wanted. Books Wanted depicts a soldier carrying a stack of books. The caption reads: Books wanted for our men in camp and "over there". Take your gifts to the public library. This poster was considered to be a success and brought Falls recognition, even though he designed the poster in less than 24 hours.

In 1923, Falls teamed up with Doubleday editor May Massee to create The ABC Book. Falls wrote and illustrated the wood block book. It features wood block cuts of various animals that are used to help represent certain letters of the alphabet, and utilizes blue, green, orange, and yellow backgrounds to enhance the black-inked woodcuts. This color scheme differs from the earth tone colors that were used by most artists at that time. Falls' wood block design is believed to have been inspired by English author William Nicholson's The Square Book of Animals. Falls received good reviews for The ABC Book, which was used to show that American authors were able to create work on the same level as their English peers. With this success, Falls would go on to illustrate several other children's books.

While he is most commonly known for his illustrations of posters and books, Falls was also involved in many different art forms. He designed fabrics, furniture, and even trade bindings. He was also involved in stage design, helping to design scenery and costumes for the American Society of Illustrators, as well as the Palace Theatre and Fifth Avenue Theatre in New York. In 1916, two years after election to the Salmagundi Club New York, he was among the 24 artists to participate in the 1914 annual (until 1924) auction of Artists Ceramics Mugs, inaugurated in 1899 to create a Library Fund. The mug is in the Permanent Collection of the club. In 1914, Falls wrote, directed, and starred in a play called "Perfectly Happy" that performed at the Berkeley Theatre.

Falls also created designs and illustrations for various magazines, including Vogue, Redbook, Collier's, and Everybody's magazines, as well as various companies such as Dodd, Meade, & Co., Edison & Co., and Marshall Field & Co.

After the 1930s, Falls began to receive fewer commissions. The dramatic, aggressive, and colorful style that had brought him success was no longer considered fashionable in the changing graphic art world. Nevertheless, Falls still produced work, such as his books The First 3000 Years and The Story of Christmas.

== Style ==
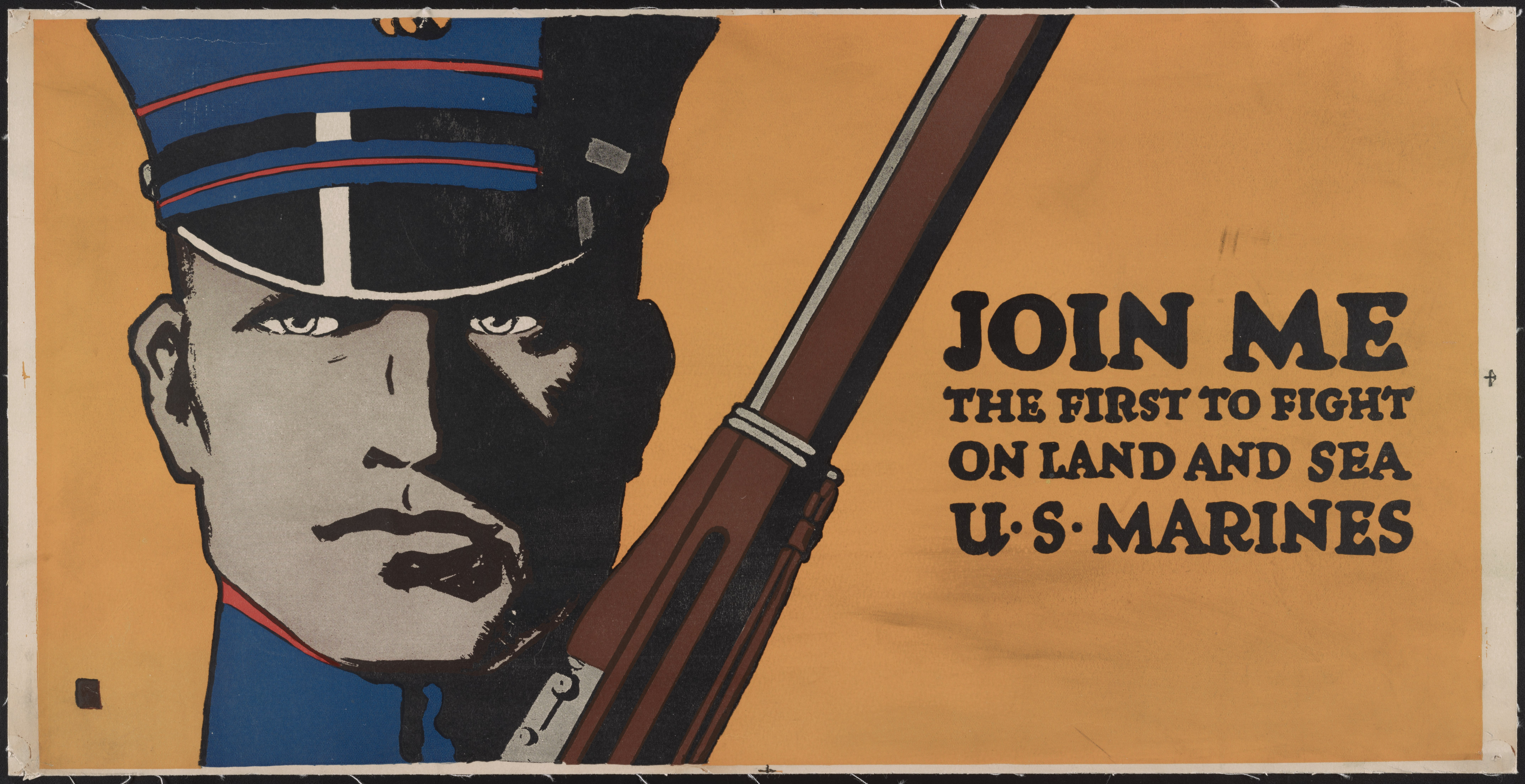
Example of Falls' use of color and his famous, black square signature

Falls is known for his skill as a letter-illustrator, often using large, "eccentric" black letters. He is also known for his woodblocks. Unlike most woodblock artists of his time, Falls incorporated brighter colors of blue, green, orange, and yellow, to contrast his black-inked woodcuts.

While working in Chicago, it is believed that Fall's style was inspired by the work of Phil May and Edward Penfield. After moving to New York, he would be influenced by the work of Art Nouveau.

Fall's signature also features its own style. On many of his illustrations, Falls drew a small box with his name or simply with the initial "F". This signature became so well known that eventually he was able to drop the initial from the box.

== Awards and exhibitions ==
In 1960, Falls was recognized for his work with the Benjamin West Clinedinst Memorial Medal, which is awarded for exceptional artistic merit. He was an honorary president of the Artists Guild.

Falls' artwork has been featured at many museums, including an exhibition of World War I posters at the Pritzker Military Museum and Library. His collection can be found at the Chapin Library of Williams College.

== Personal life and death ==
On March 15, 1917, Falls married Bedelia M. Croly, with whom he had a daughter, Bedelia Jane. Many of his books were dedicated to his daughter, including The ABC Book, which he created to help her learn the alphabet.

Charles Buckles Falls died age 85 on April 15, 1960.

== Gallery ==
Posters designed by C.B. Falls

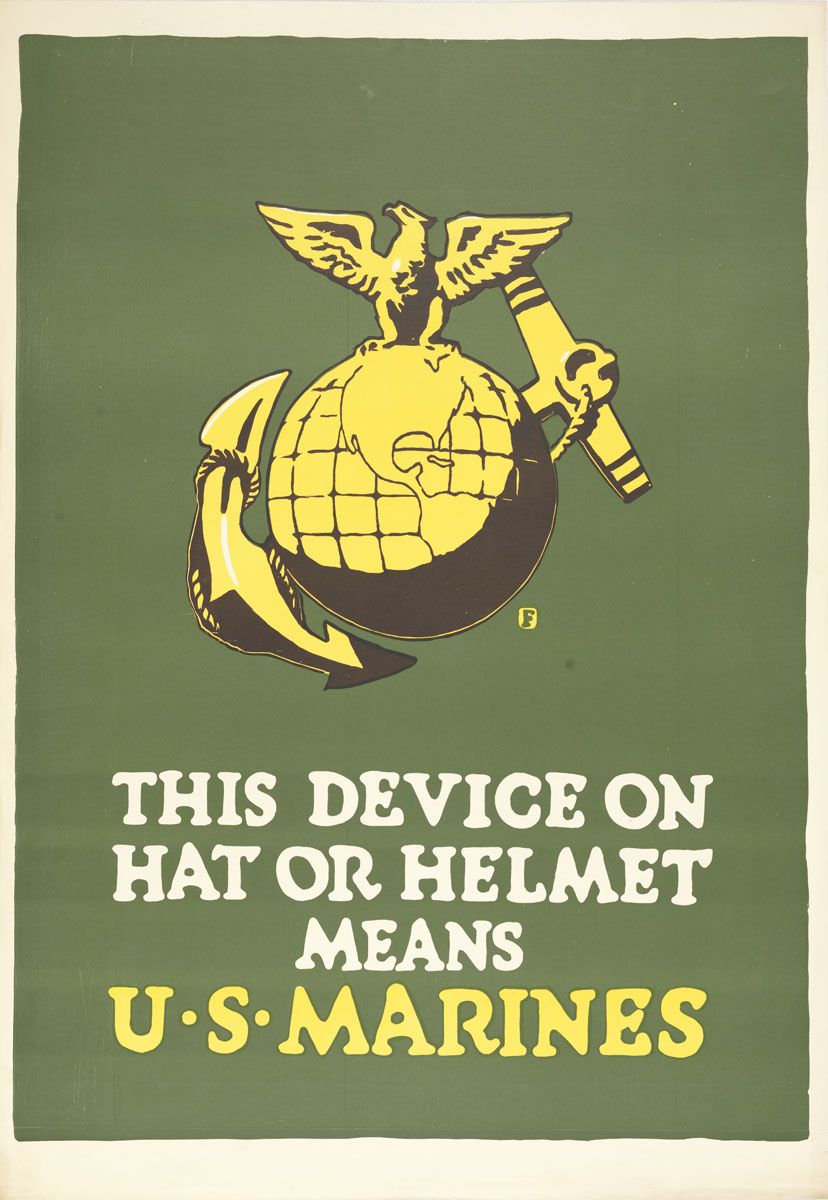

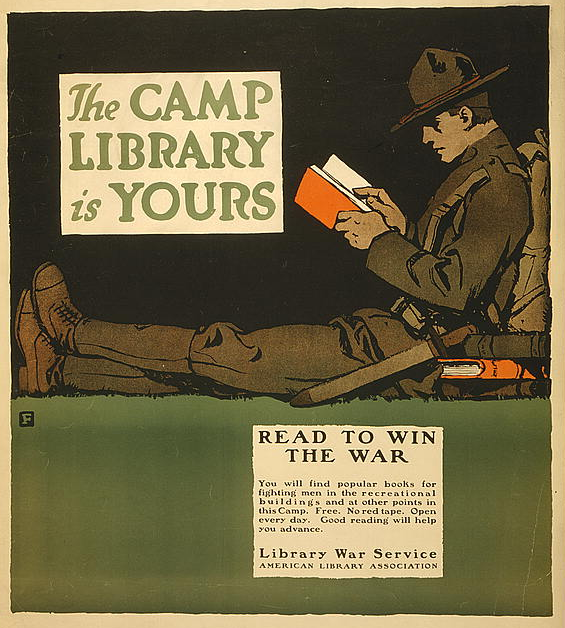

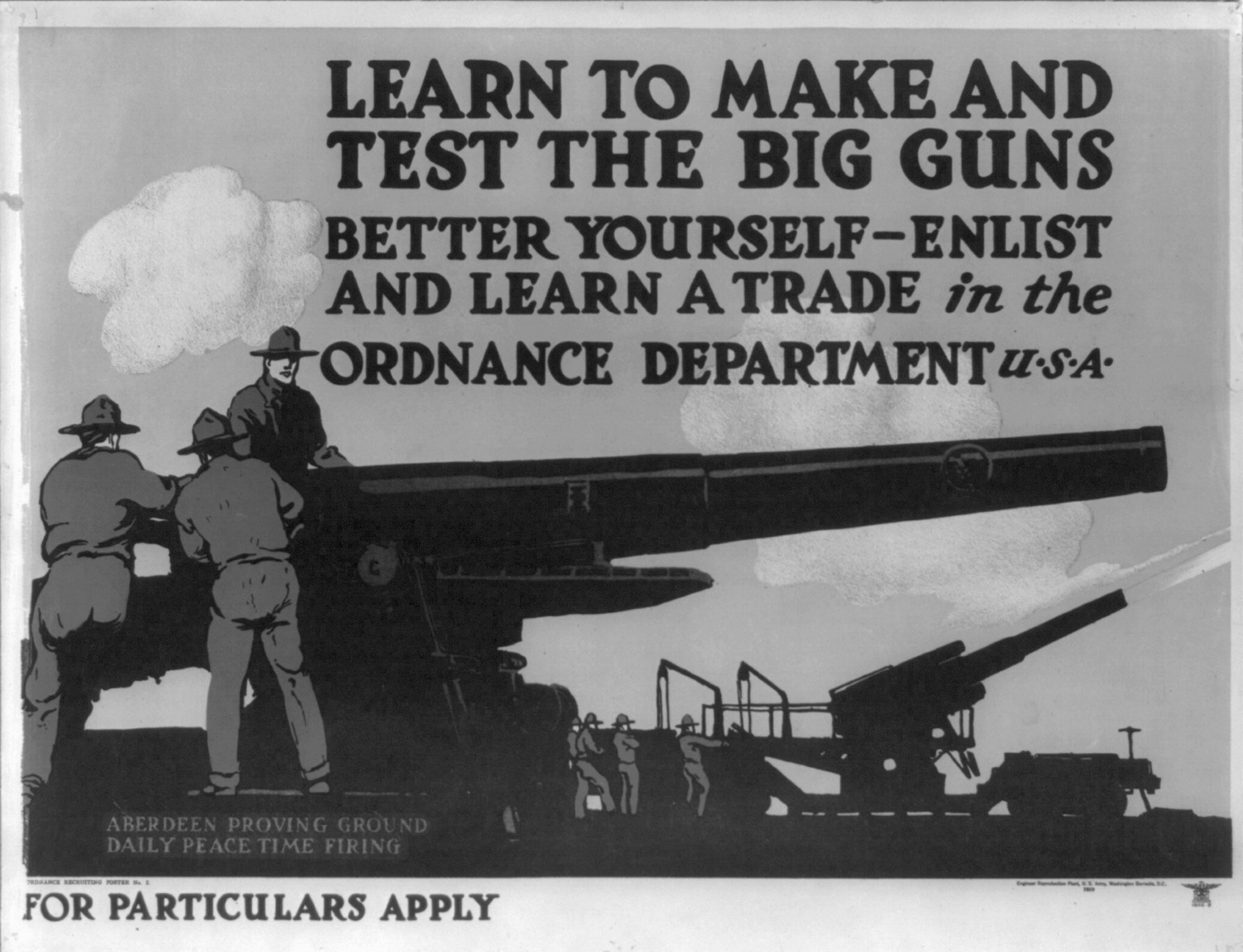

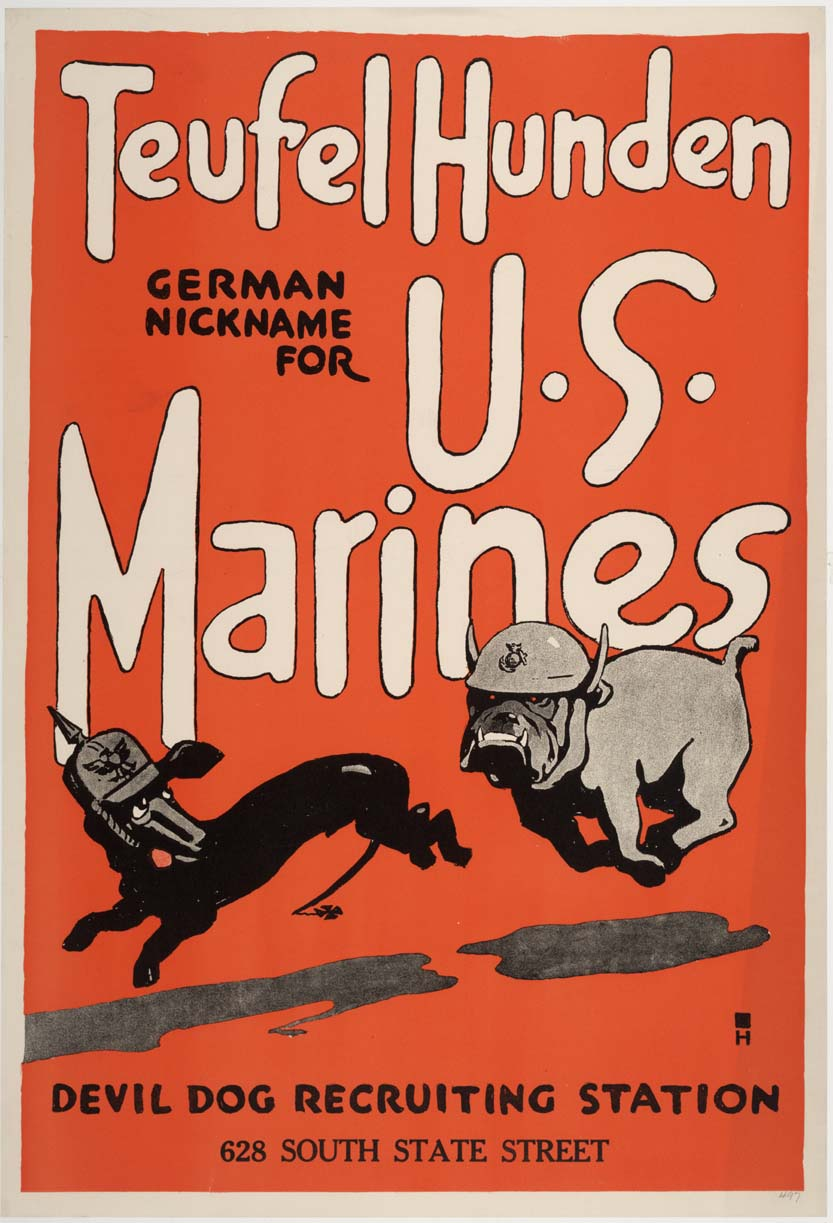

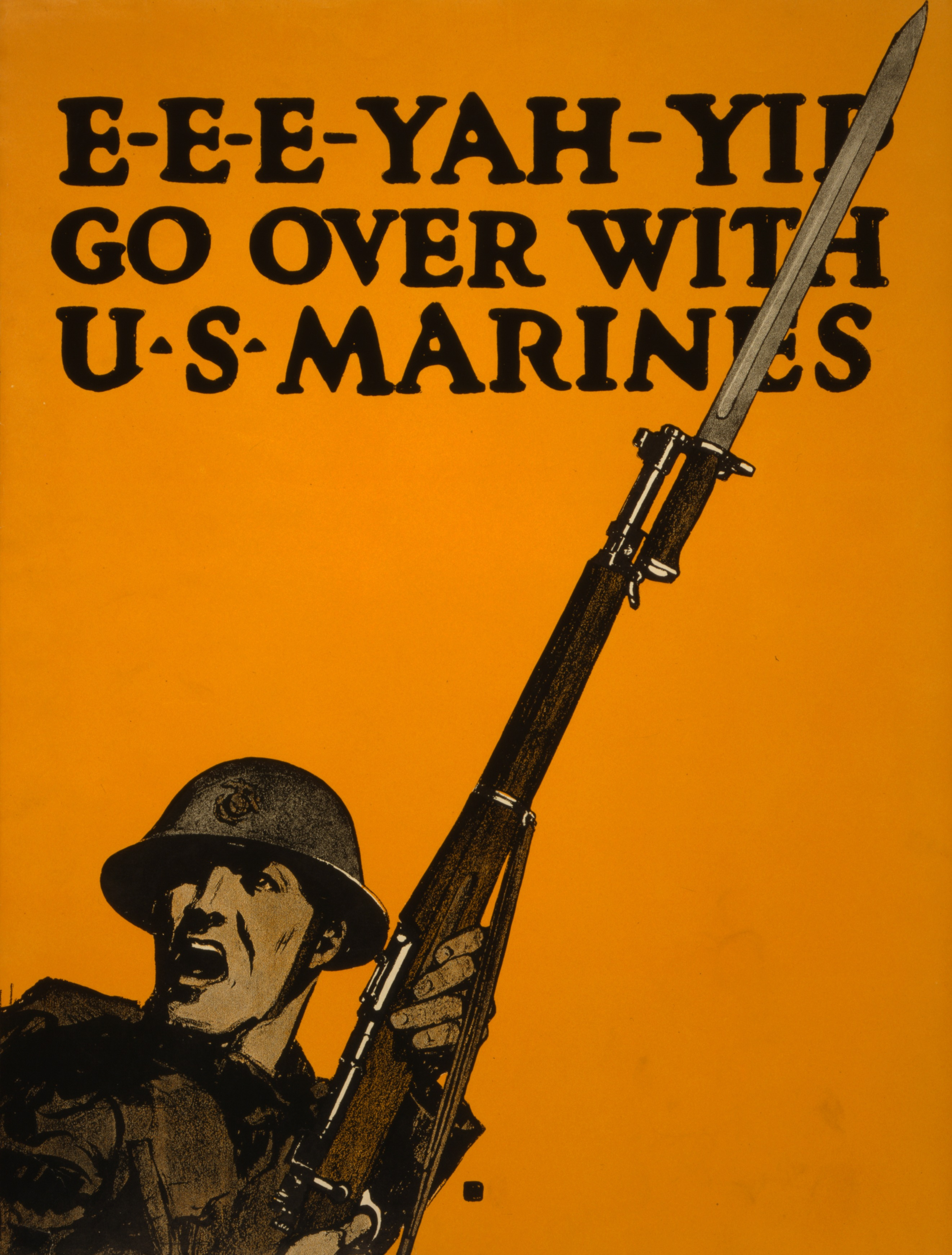

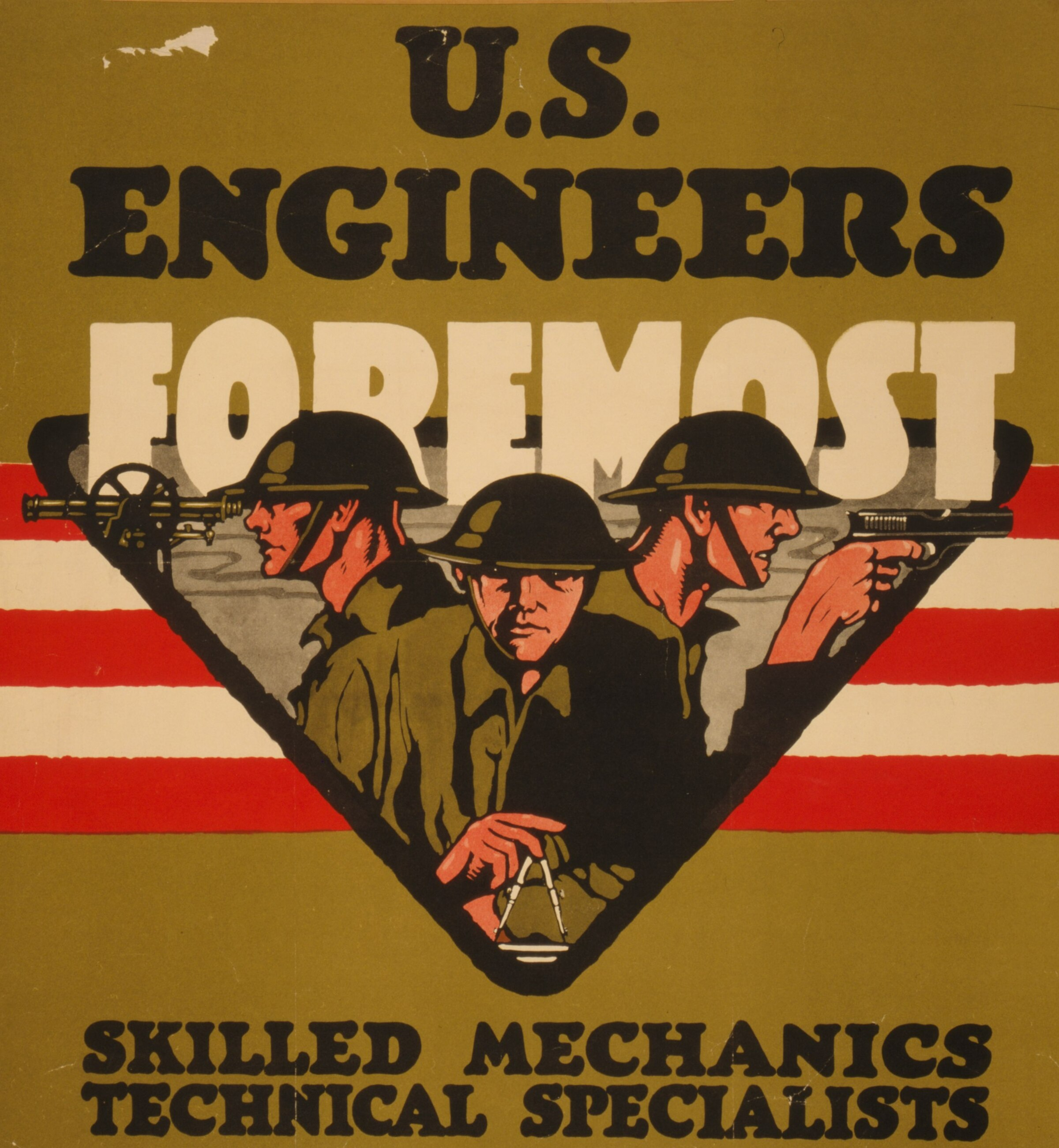

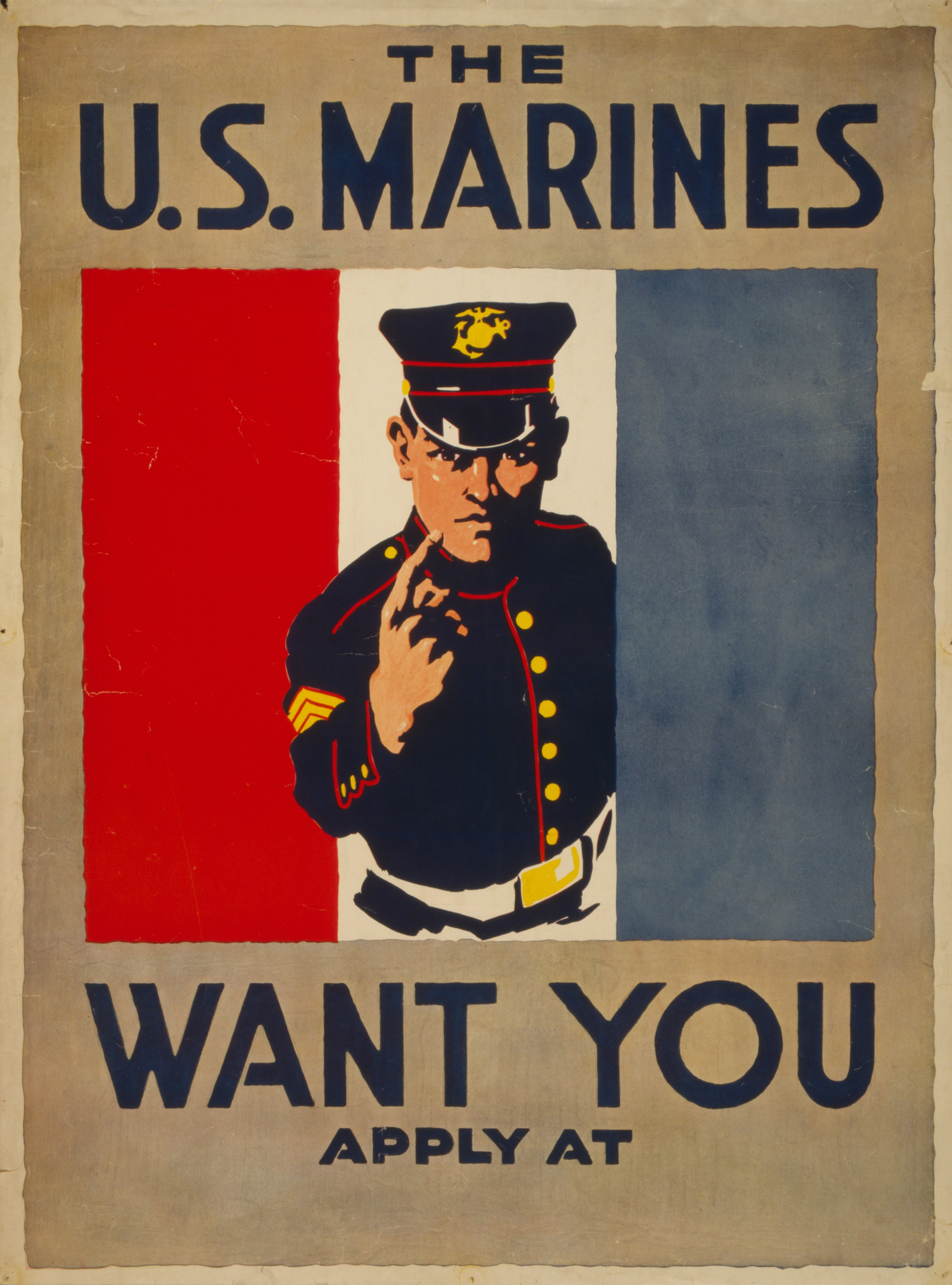

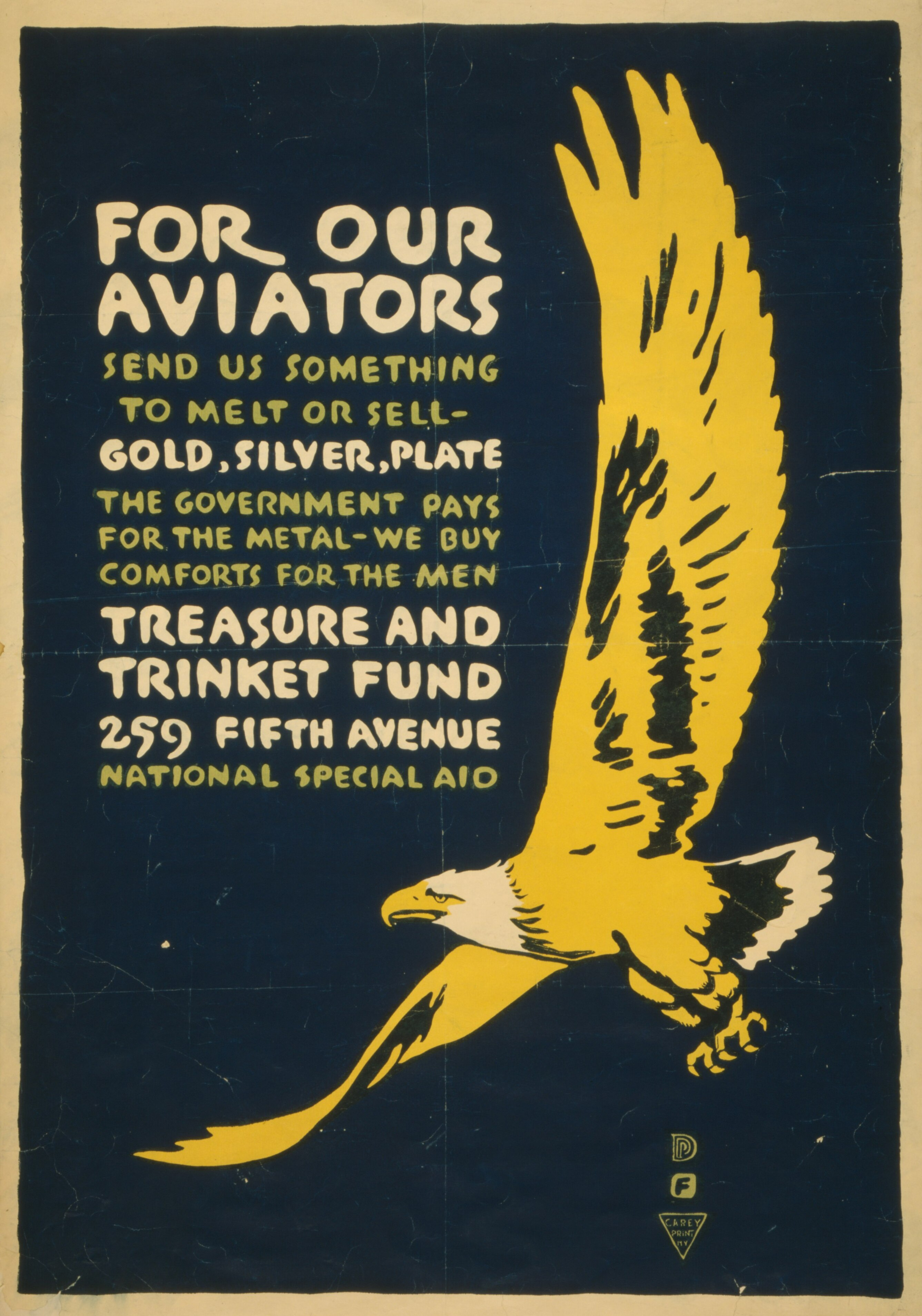

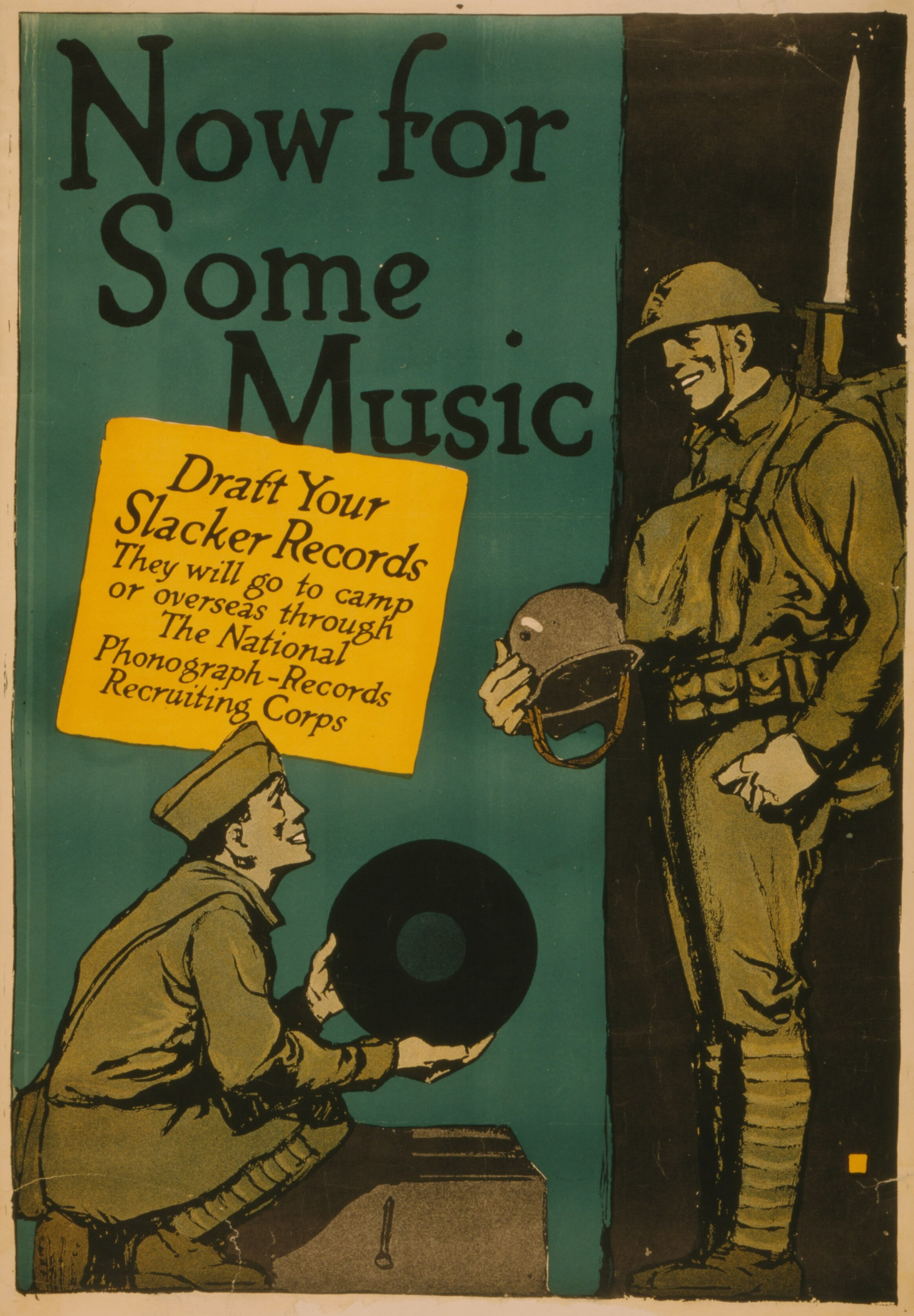

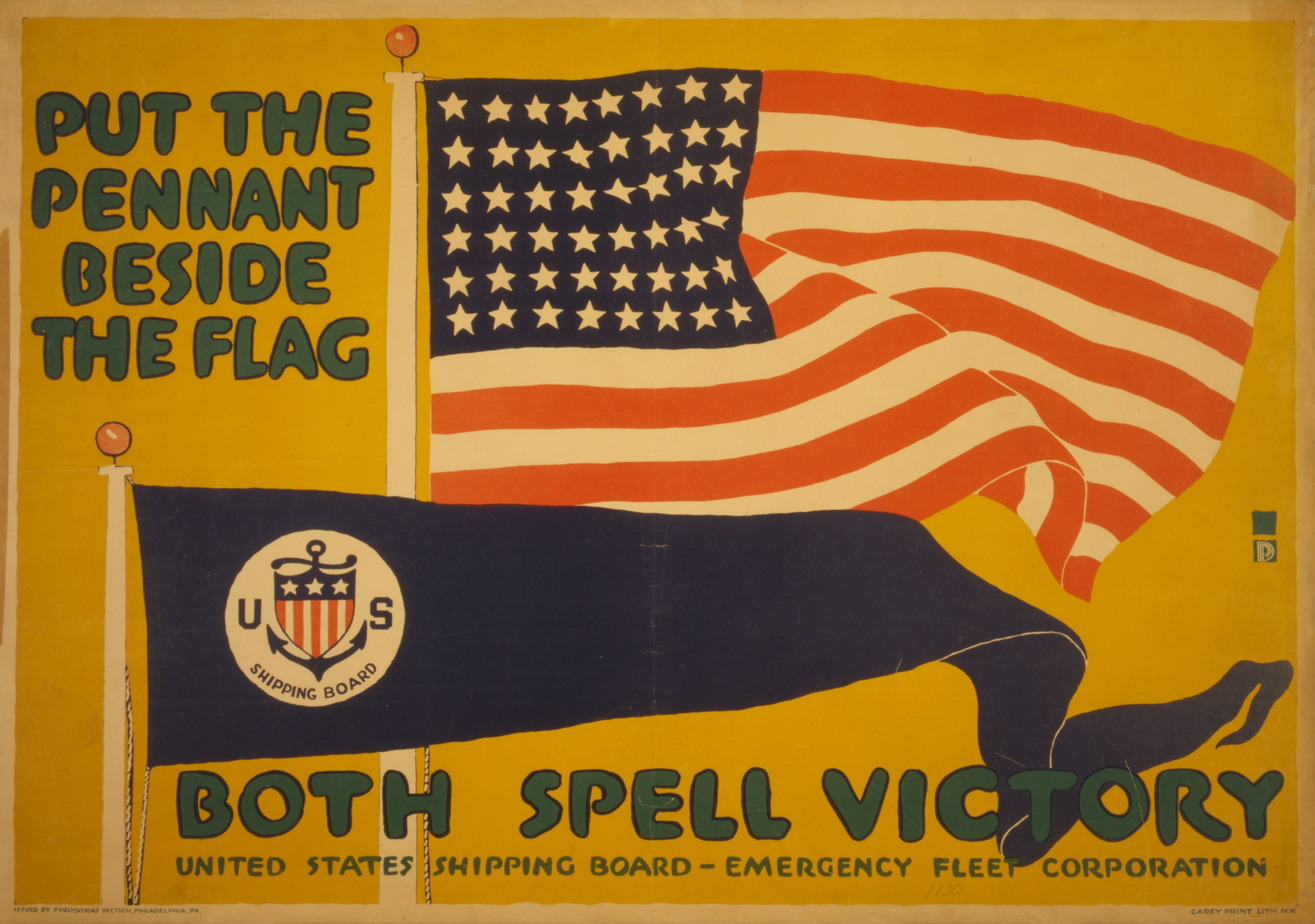

== See also ==
- Decorative Designers
