= Cutaneous horn =

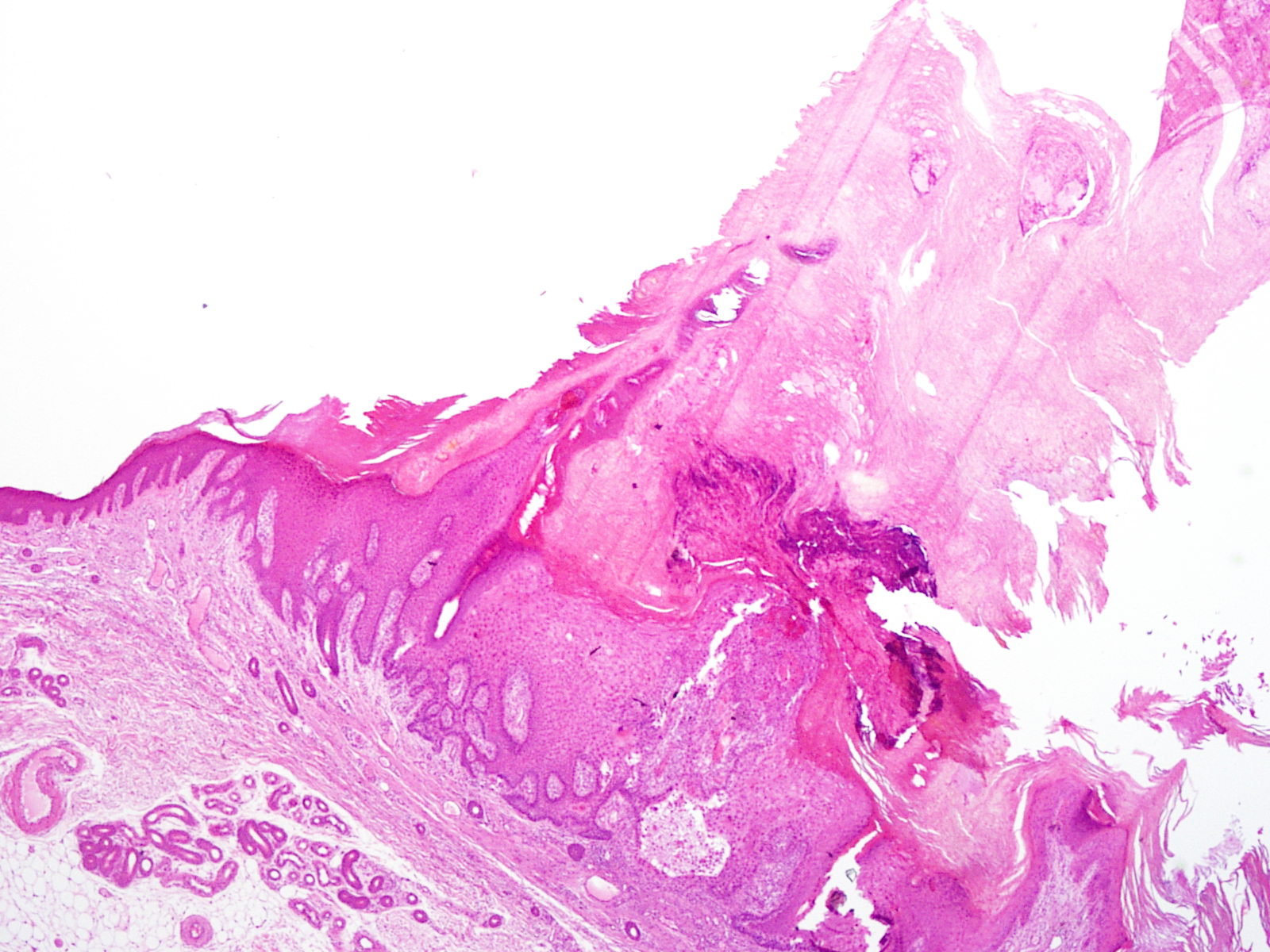
- Actinic keratosis, pre-cancerous area of thick, scaly, or crusty skin (below) with cutaneous horn tissue (above)

Cutaneous horns, also known by the Latin name cornu cutaneum, are unusual keratinous skin tumors with the appearance of horns, or sometimes of wood or coral. Formally, this is a clinical diagnosis for a "conical projection above the surface of the skin". They are usually small and localized but can, in very rare cases, be much larger. Although often benign, they can also be malignant or premalignant.

== Signs and symptoms ==
The lesion at the base of the keratin mound is benign in the majority of cases. Malignancy is present in up to 20% of cases, with squamous-cell carcinoma being the most common type. The incidence of squamous-cell carcinoma increases to 37% when the cutaneous horn is present on the penis.

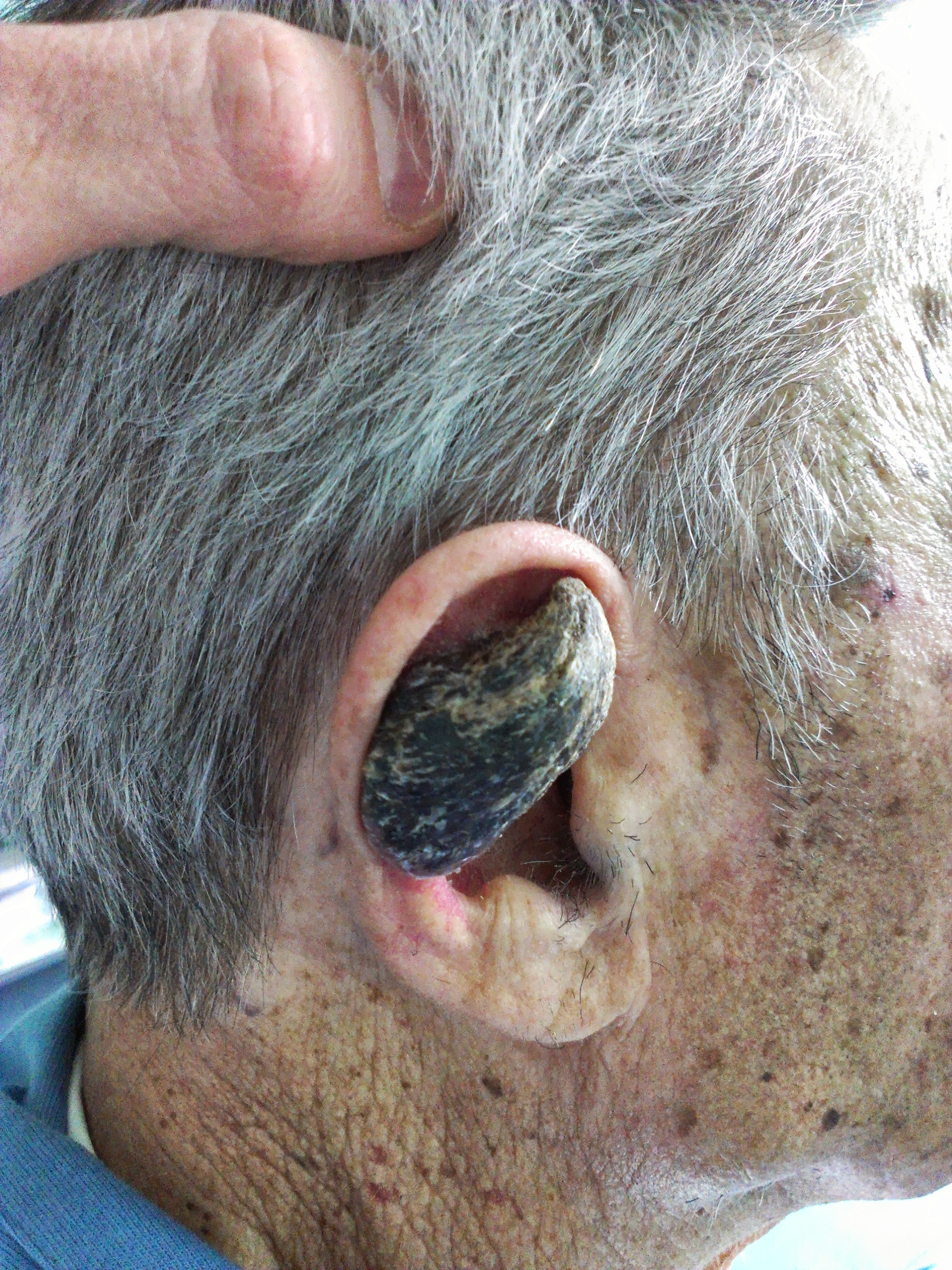
Cutaneous horn in right ear

== Cause ==
The cause of cutaneous horns is still unknown, but it is believed that exposure to radiation can trigger the condition. This is evidenced by a higher rate of cases occurring on the face and hands, areas that are often exposed to sunlight. Moreover, there is a higher prevalence in Asian countries with a warm climate. Other cases have reported cutaneous horns arising from burn scars. As with many other wart-like skin conditions, a link to the HPV virus family, especially the HPV-2 subtype, has been suggested.

== Diagnosis ==
Histologically they are characterized by compact proliferation of keratin.

== Notable cases ==
- Zhang Ruifang, aged 101 (as of 2010), living in Linlou Village, Henan province, China, has grown a cutaneous horn on her forehead, resembling what those who have examined her and her family call "Devil's Horns". Notably, this growth has expanded to reach a total of 6 cm (2.5 inches) in length. Another is forming on the opposite side of her forehead.
- Liang Xiuzhen, aged 87 (as of 2015) living in Guiyan village in Ziyang City, Sichuan province, China, grew a 13-centimetre (5.1-inch) pointed horn from her forehead, earning her the nickname "Unicorn Woman".
- Huang Yuanfan, aged 84 (living in Ziyuan, China).
- Shyam Lal Yadav, aged 74 (living in Madhya Pradesh, India) grew a 10-centimetre (4-inch) horn after an accident, and later had it surgically removed.
- Madame Dimanche ("Widow Sunday"), a French woman living in Paris in the early 19th century, grew a 24.9-centimetre (9.8-inch) horn from her forehead in six years from the age of 76 before it was successfully removed by French surgeon Br. Joseph Souberbeille (1754–1846). A wax model of her head is on display at the Mütter Museum, The College of Physicians of Philadelphia, US.
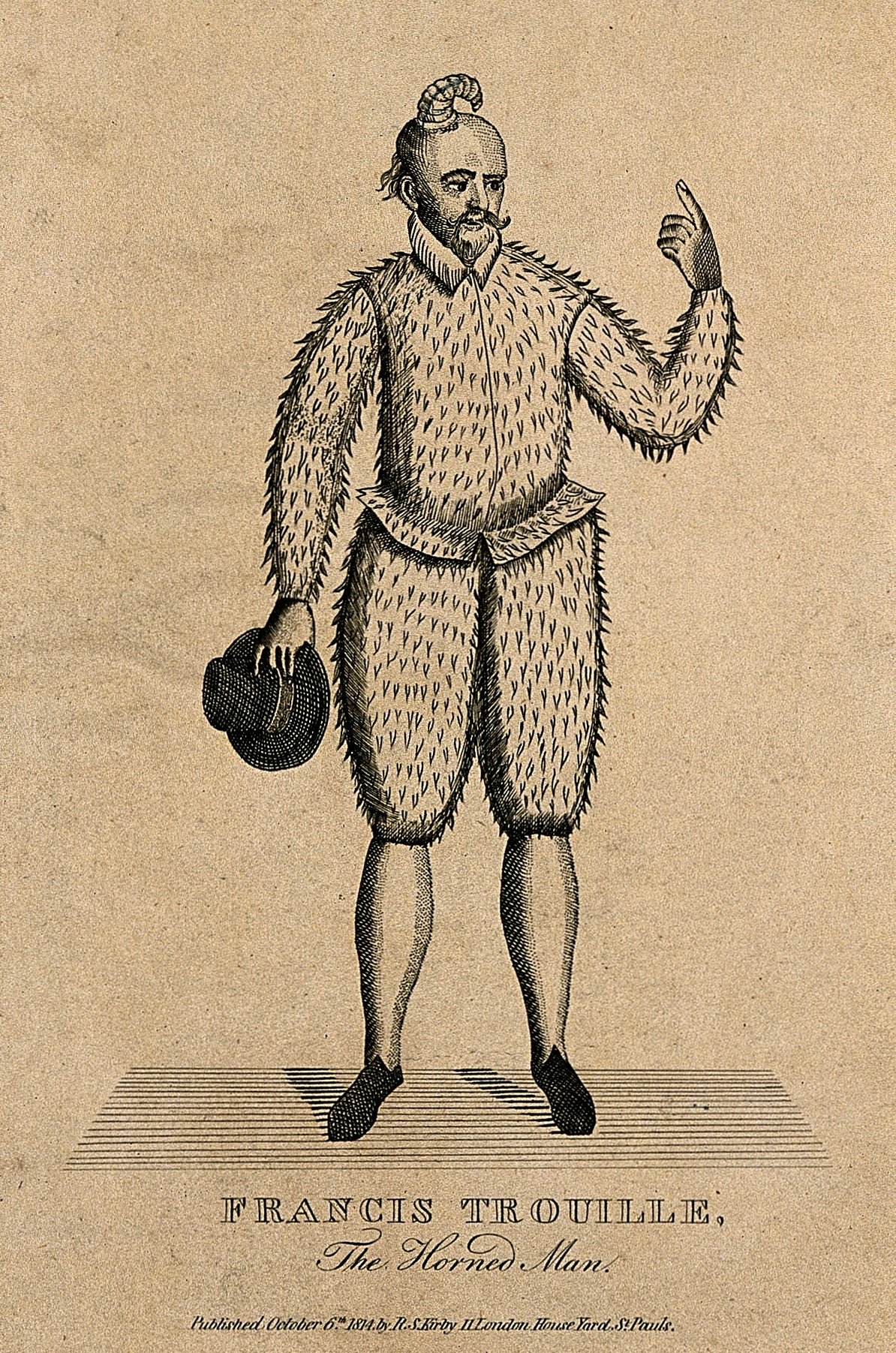
François Trouille

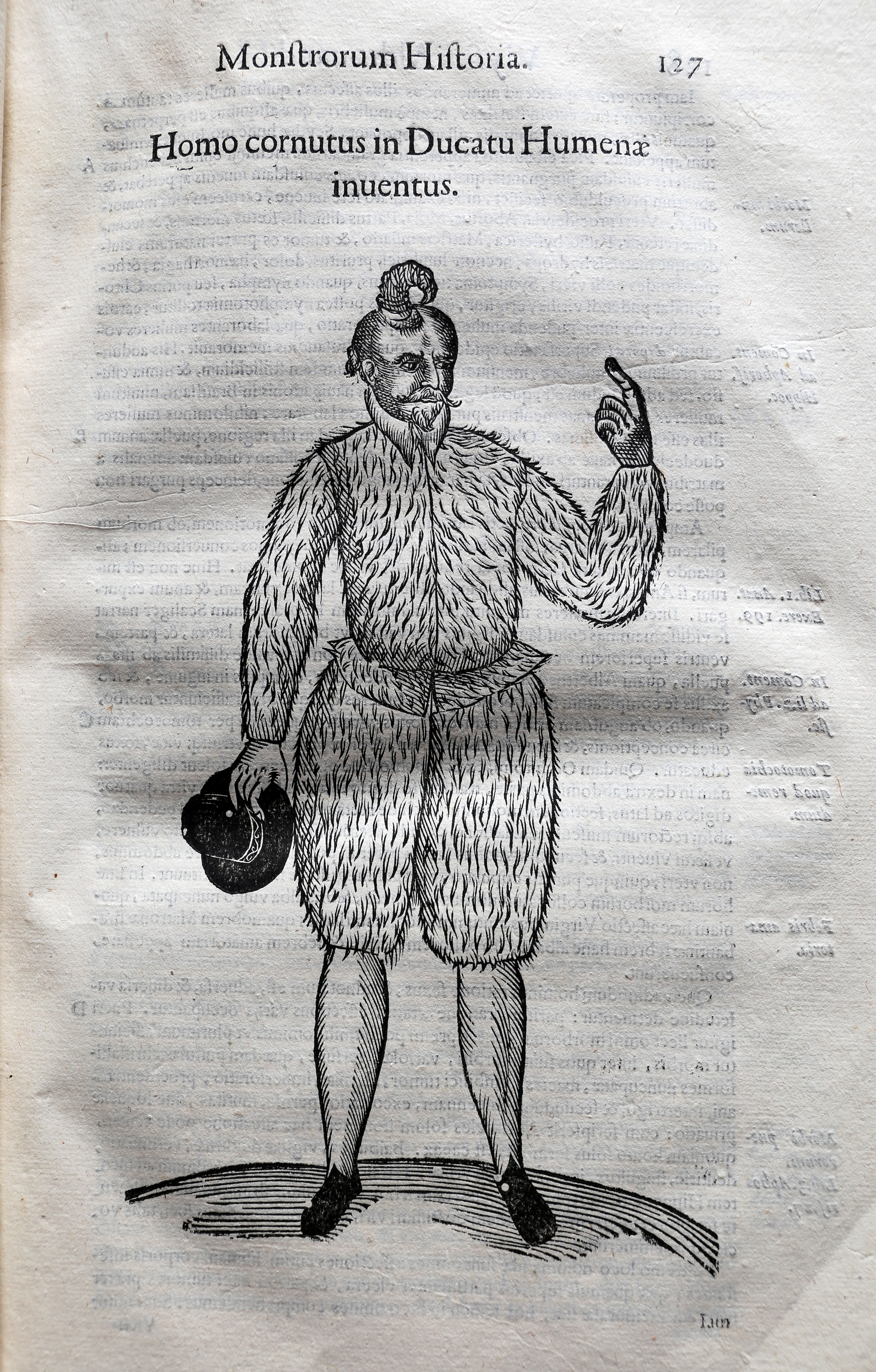
François Trouille, in the works of Ulisse Aldrovandi

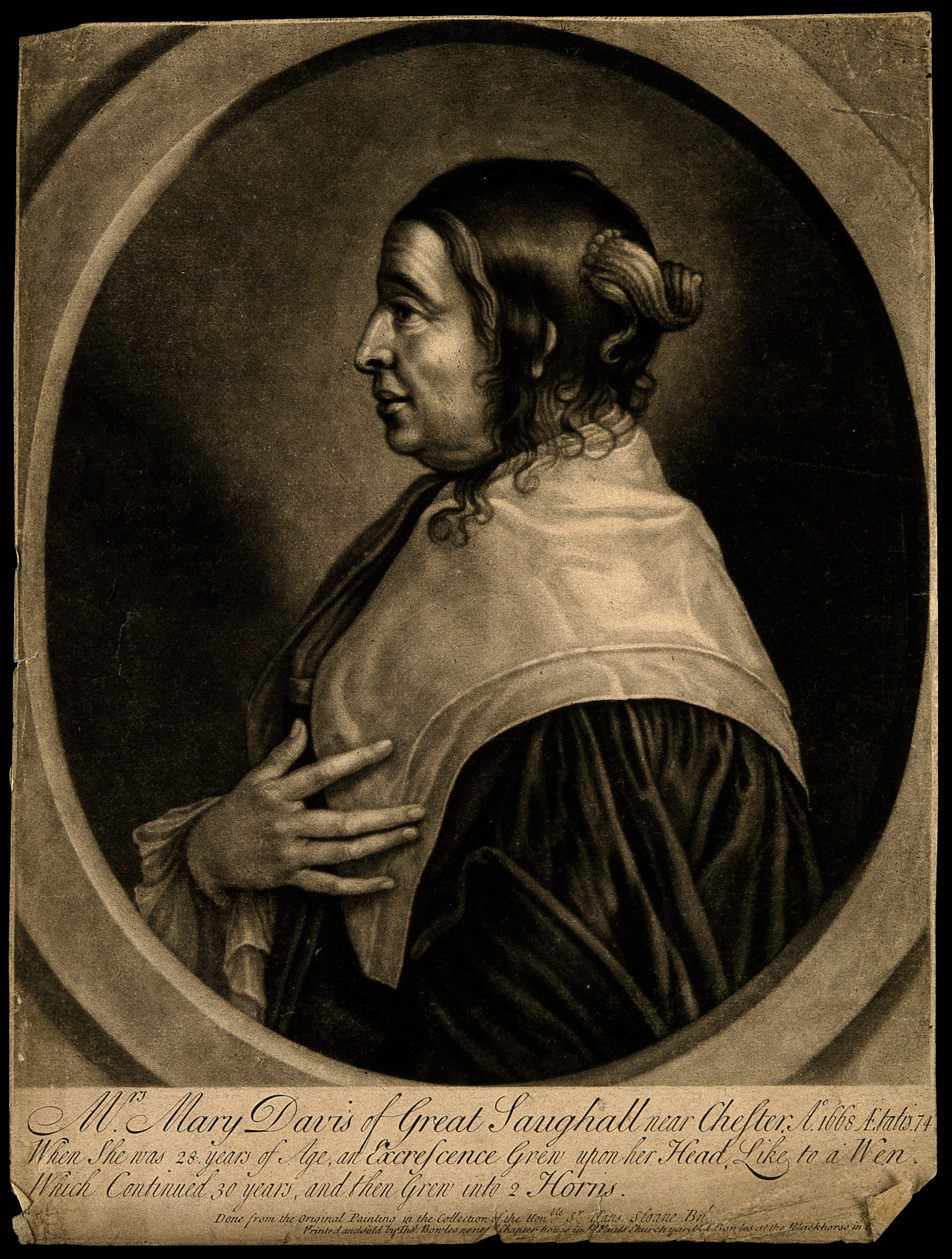
Mary Davis, age 74, of Chester

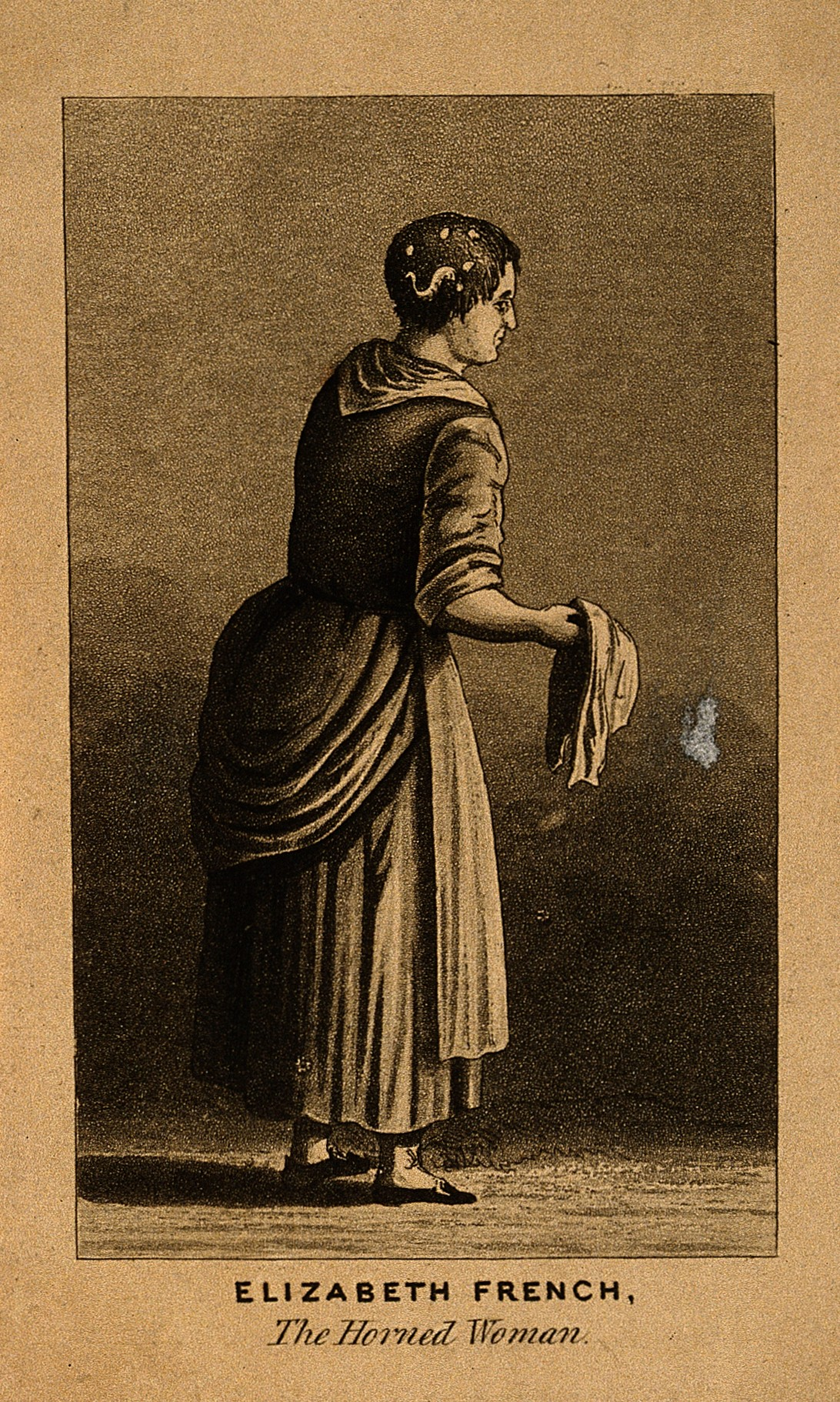
Elizabeth French of Tenterden

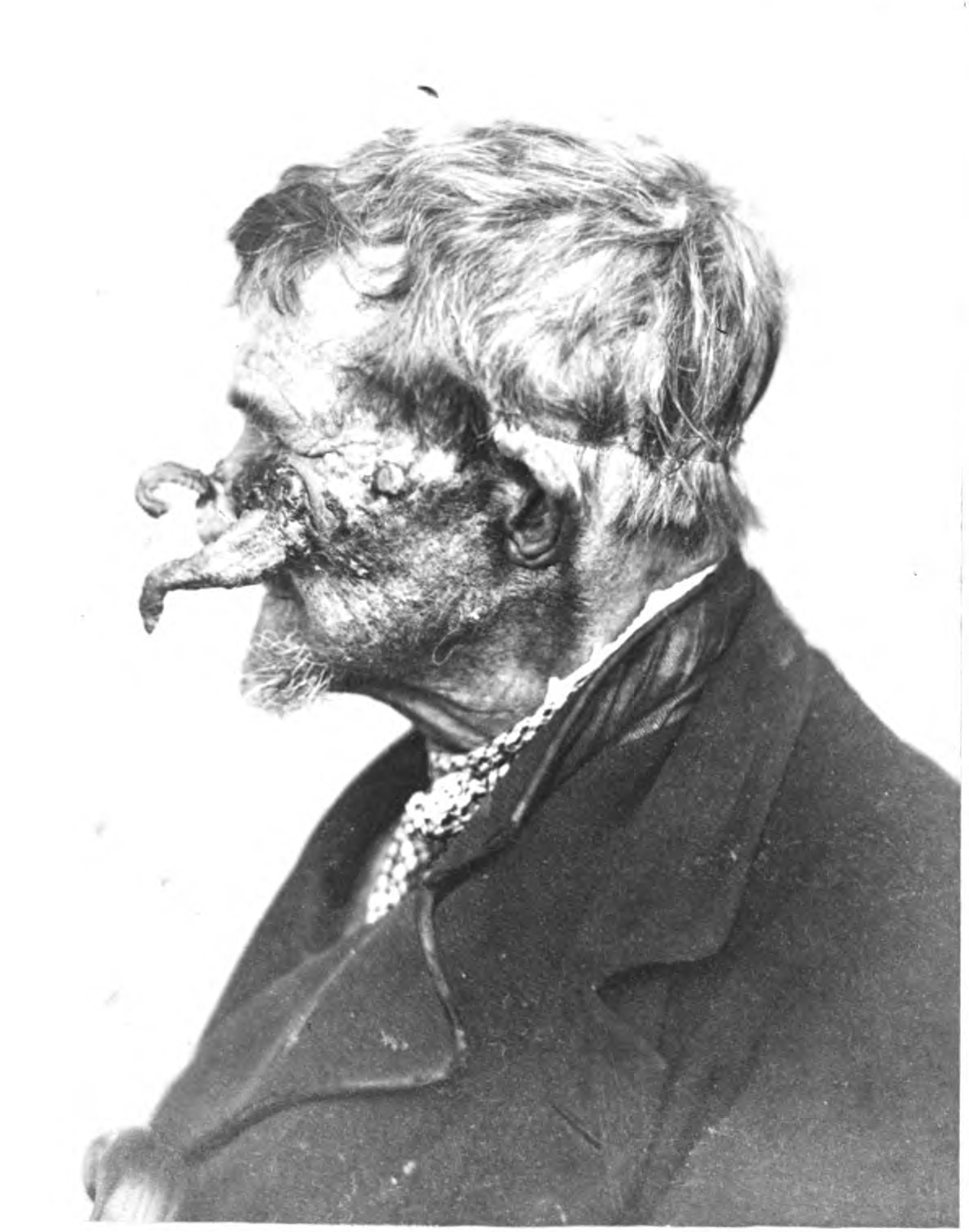
Capt. Levi Becket of Atlantic City, New Jersey, 1870

== See also ==
- Wart
- Actinic keratosis
- Epidermodysplasia verruciformis
- List of cutaneous conditions
- Shope papilloma virus
