= Dedee =

Dedee or Dédée is a nickname which may refer to:

- Andrée de Jongh (1916–2007), member of the World War II Belgian Resistance, nicknamed "Dédée"
- DeDee Nathan (born 1968), American retired heptathlete
- Dedee Pfeiffer (born 1964), American actress

== See also ==
- DD (disambiguation)
- Dede (disambiguation)
- Deede (disambiguation)
- Deedee
