= Dede Koswara =

Indonesian carpenter (1971–2016)

Dede Koswara (1971 – January 30, 2016), also known as the "Tree Man", was an Indonesian carpenter with epidermodysplasia verruciformis (EV), a rare disease that causes the human papillomavirus (HPV) to grow uncontrollably, leading to the development of warts resembling tree bark. For most of his life, he was shunned for having an unknown disease. It was not until his later years that he received notoriety and was given multiple treatments for his condition.

== Early years ==
Dede Koswara was healthy from birth up to his early childhood. At the age of ten, he started to develop warts around his injured knee, which then grew onto his limbs and face. He was unable to afford treatment for the disease and had initially tried to remove one of the larger warts, however the wart eventually regrew. He attempted to live a normal life, working as a craftsman. He married at the age of 18 and had two children. The warts continued to grow uncontrollably, which eventually limited his movements and made him dependent on others for his daily routines. Having become too dependent, he lost his job, was divorced by his wife, and was separated from his children. His parents offered him to live with them so as to provide help. He was later hired by a carnival owner to be a part of a traveling freak show.

== Later years ==
In November 2007, a video about Dede Koswara appeared on the Internet. His story was shared on the Discovery Channel and TLC series My Shocking Stories (Extraordinary People) in the episode "Half Man Half Tree". In August 2008, an episode of ABC's Medical Mysteries, titled "Tree Man", was released, which was dedicated to Koswara's story.

In August 2008, he underwent nine operations and had 95% of warts, about 6 kg (13 lb), surgically removed. During this time, his health had significantly improved so much that he regained the use of his hands and feet. However, the warts started to regrow and he was informed that two surgeries a year were necessary to keep the infections down.

Dede Koswara died on 30 January 2016, aged 44, at the Hasan Sadikin Hospital, Bandung, Indonesia, from a series of health problems relating to his condition.
