= Decorative Designers =

19th- to 20th-century American artistic group

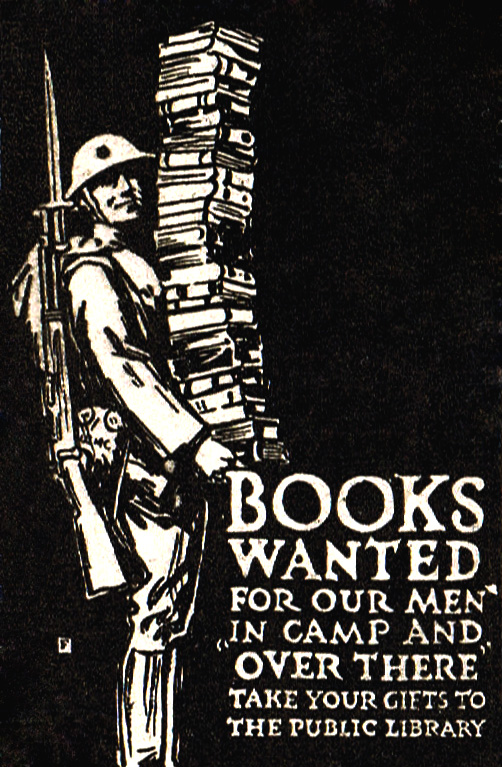
- "Books Wanted" by Charles Buckles Falls (Harper's Magazine November 1918)
- Years active: c. 1895–1931
- Location: United States
- Major figures: Henry Thayer, Emma Thayer, Charles Buckles Falls, Jay Chambers, Rome K. Richardson, Adam Empie
- Influences: Art Nouveau

Decorative Designers AKA "DD" (1895–1931) was an American firm of artists, each of whom designed various aspects of books and other publications, "an early example of division of labor in creative work." The "DD" monogram appears on more than 25,000 book covers, dust jackets, and text decorations of the late 19th and early 20th centuries. In 1906, they had offices at 38 Union Square, New York City.

== Members ==
- Henry W. Thayer (1867–1940), co-founder and President (1906)
- Jay Chambers (1877–1929), Secretary (1906)
- Emma Reddington Lee Thayer (1874–1973), co-founder
- Charles Buckles Falls (1874–1960)
- Rome K. Richardson
- Adam Empie

== See also ==
- Charles Buckles Falls
- Howard Pyle
- John Espey
- American Pre-Raphaelites
- Morris & Co.
- American Union of Decorative Artists and Craftsmen

== External sources ==
- Smithsonian: Decorative Designers (Firm)
- "Decorative Designers. bdd". University of Pennsylvania.
- Galleries of Decorative Designers work
- Gallery Archive of Richard Minsky
