= Mej =

Mej may refer to:

- Mej, Sabzevar, a village in Razavi Khorasan Province, Iran
- Mej, Torqabeh and Shandiz, another village in Razavi Khorasan Province, Iran
- Mej River, a river in Rajasthan state, India
- Meyah language, a language spoken in Tambrauw Regency, Indonesia, by ISO 639 code
