= Deedee =

Deedee, DeeDee or Dee Dee may refer to:

== Given name ==
- DeeDee Halleck (born 1940), American media activist
- DeeDee Jonrowe (born 1953), American kennel owner and dog musher, three-time runner up in the Iditarod Trail Sled Dog Race
- Deedee Magno Hall (born 1975), American actress and singer

== Nickname ==
- Clauddine "Dee Dee" Blanchard (1967–2015), American murder victim and the late mother of Gypsy-Rose Blanchard
- Dee Dee Bridgewater (born 1950), American jazz singer and songwriter
- Deedee Corradini (1944–2015), mayor of Salt Lake City, Utah
- D'Andre Hill (born 1973), American track and field coach and former sprinter
- Dolores Kenniebrew (born 1945), American singer, member of the Crystals
- Dee Dee Myers (born 1961), American political analyst and former White House press secretary for President Clinton
- DeeDee Trotter (born 1982), American sprinter
- Dee Dee Wood, American choreographer, particularly in the 1960s and '70s

== Stage name ==
- Dee Dee Phelps, American singer, songwriter and author born Mary Sperling, half of the 1960s duo Dick and Dee Dee
- Dee Dee Ramone (1951–2002), German-American songwriter and musician, founding member, songwriter and bassist for punk rock band the Ramones
- Dee Dee Sharp (born 1945), American R&B singer
- Dee Dee Warwick (1942–2008), American soul singer
- Dee Dee Wilde, a member of the British dance troupe Pan's People

== Fictional characters ==
- Dee Dee, from Dexter's Laboratory
- Dee Dee, from Oggy and the Cockroaches
- Dee Dee, from Limmy's Show
- Delia and Deidre Dennis, the Dee Dee Twins, from the DC Animated Universe
- Dee Dee Holloway, from Big Nate
- Dee Dee Sykes, from Captain Caveman and the Teen Angels

== See also ==
- DD (disambiguation)
- Dede (disambiguation)
- Dedee, a nickname
- Deede (disambiguation)
- Didi (disambiguation)
- Dee D. Jackson (born 1954), English singer and musician
- 2014 UZ224, a large trans-Neptunian object nicknamed DeeDee, for Distant Dwarf
