= Dedé (footballer, born 2002) =

Brazilian footballer

Personal information
- Full name: Vitor Hugo Oliveira Corrêa da Silva
- Date of birth: 17 April 2002 (age 24)
- Height: 1.78 m (5 ft 10 in)
- Position: Forward

Team information
- Current team: CSA

Youth career
- –2019: Boavista

Senior career*
Years	Team	Apps	(Gls)
2020–2021	Botafogo	1	(0)
2022	Audax Rio	0	(0)
2022–	CSA	2	(0)
2023	→ Falcon (loan)	7	(0)
- * Club domestic league appearances and goals as of 6 August 2023

Vitor Hugo Oliveira Corrêa da Silva (born 17 April 2002), commonly known as Dedé, is a Brazilian footballer who plays for CSA.

== Career statistics ==
=== Club ===
As of 6 July 2020.

Club	Season	League			State league		Cup		Continental		Other		Total	
Club	Season	Division	Apps	Goals	Apps	Goals	Apps	Goals	Apps	Goals	Apps	Goals	Apps	Goals
Botafogo	2020	Série A	0	0	1 (Note: Appearance(s) in Campeonato Carioca)	0	0	0	0	0	0	0	1	0
Career total			0	0	1	0	0	0	0	0	0	0	1	0
