= USS Deede =

Evarts-class destroyer escort in the United States Navy

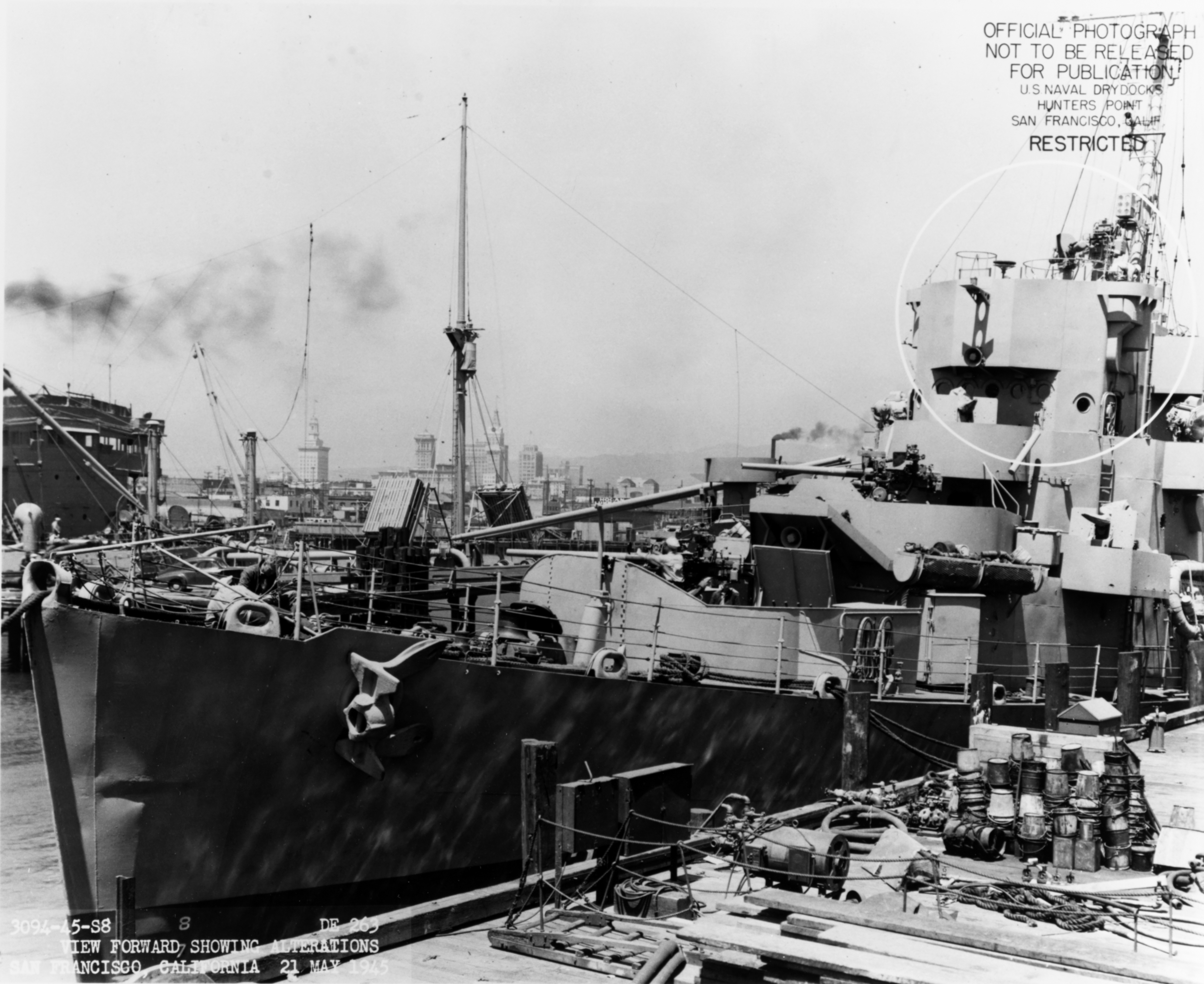
- Deede on 21 May 1945

History

United States
- Name: USS Deede
- Namesake: LeRoy Clifford Deede
- Builder: Boston Navy Yard
- Launched: 6 April 1943
- Commissioned: 29 July 1943
- Decommissioned: 9 January 1946
- Honors and awards: 6 battle stars (World War II)
- Fate: Sold for scrapping, 12 June 1947

General characteristics
- Type: Evarts-class destroyer escort
- Displacement: 1,140 long tons (1,158 t)
- Length: 289 ft 5 in (88.21 m)
- Beam: 35 ft 1 in (10.69 m)
- Draft: 8 ft 3 in (2.51 m)
- Speed: 21 knots (39 km/h; 24 mph)
- Complement: 156
- Armament: 3 × single 3"/50 Mk.22 dual-purpose guns; 1 × Hedgehog depth charge projector; 2 × depth charge tracks

USS Deede (DE-263) was an Evarts-class destroyer escort in the United States Navy.

== Design ==
The Evarts-class destroyer escorts were 289 ft 5 in (88.21 m) long overall, and they had a beam of 35 ft 2 in (10.72 m). They had an average draft of 10 ft 1 in (3.07 m) at their full load displacement of 1,416 long tons (1,439 t). Each ship had a normal crew numbered 156 officers and sailors.

Deede was propelled by a pair of diesel motors manufactured by General Motors, which drove a pair of screw propellers. Her propulsion system was rated to produce 6,000 brake horsepower (4,500 kW) for a top speed of 19.5 knots (36.1 km/h; 22.4 mph). Oil storage amounted to between 131 and 197 long tons (133 and 200 t), which allowed a cruising radius of up to 6,000 nautical miles (11,000 km; 6,900 mi) at an economical pace of 10 knots (19 km/h; 12 mph).

The ship's armament consisted of a main battery of three 3-inch (76 mm) /50-caliber guns in individual pivot mounts, which could be used against air or surface targets. These were supported by a light anti-aircraft battery that initially consisted of four 1.1 in (28 mm) /75-caliber guns in a quadruple mount and nine 20 mm (0.79 in) Oerlikon guns. For attacks against submarines, the ship was equipped with a Hedgehog mortar, eight depth charge throwers, and two depth charge racks.

== Service history ==
Deede was named for LeRoy Deede, who was a naval avitor killed during the Philippines campaign in June 1942. The ship was launched 6 April 1943 by Boston Navy Yard; sponsored by Mrs. M. B. Deede, mother of Lieutenant (junior grade) Deede; and commissioned 29 July 1943.

Deede arrived at Pearl Harbor on 17 November 1943. She got underway on 26 November for the invasion of the Gilberts, screened a convoy to Tarawa, then patrolled off Makin until 23 December when she returned to Pearl Harbor. Deede arrived at Majuro on 3 February 1944 for service as harbor pilot and patrol vessel during the occupation of that island. She returned to Pearl Harbor for training exercises from 21 February to 26 March, then escorted convoys between Majuro and Pearl Harbor until 26 May. She sailed from Pearl Harbor on 4 June for Eniwetok, arriving ten days later, and from this base escorted an oiler task unit which refueled task force TF 53 at sea on 20 June at the close of the Battle of the Philippine Sea, and TF 58 during the raid on the Bonins on 24 June.

Between 6 July and 1 September 1944 Deede served as screening and patrol ship during the assault and capture of the Marianas. After a brief overhaul at Eniwetok, she escorted Crater (AK-70) to Guadalcanal, then on 2 October joined the escort for a convoy to recently invaded Peleliu. She continued convoy duty-aiding in the occupation of the Palaus until 17 November when she sailed for Pearl Harbor. Deede served as escort and target in the training of submarines out of Pearl Harbor until 6 February 1945 when she got underway to escort a convoy of cargo and transport ships to reinforce the recent landings on Iwo Jima, arriving on 23 February. She remained off Iwo Jima on patrol until 20 March when she screened the transports returning the 4th Marines to Pearl Harbor, arriving on 4 April.

After overhaul at San Francisco and training at San Diego and Pearl Harbor, Deede joined the replenishment group for the 3rd Fleet at Ulithi on 21 July, operating with this group during the final air raids and bombardments on the Japanese mainland. She served as communications linking ship between hospital ships Benevolence (AH-13) and Tranquility (AH-14) from 16 to 21 August, then rejoined the logistics group to enter Tokyo Bay on 2 October. Four days later she got underway for Pearl Harbor where she served with the Hawaiian Sea Frontier from 17 October to 19 November. Deede arrived at San Francisco on 25 November, was decommissioned there on 9 January 1946, and sold on 12 June 1947.

== Awards ==
Deede was awarded six battle stars for World War II service.
