= Didi (footballer, born 1994) =

Portuguese footballer

Personal information
- Full name: José Diogo Macedo da Silva
- Date of birth: 3 February 1994 (age 32)
- Place of birth: Guimarães, Portugal
- Height: 1.77 m (5 ft 9 1/2 in)
- Position: Midfielder

Team information
- Current team: Vitória Guimarães B
- Number: 34

Youth career
- 2008–2013: Vitória Guimarães

Senior career*
| Years | Team | Apps | (Gls) |
| 2013–2014 | Benfica B | 0 | (0) |
| 2014–2018 | Braga B | 133 | (6) |
| 2018–2019 | Arouca | 23 | (0) |
| 2019– | Vitória Guimarães B | 5 | (0) |
- * Club domestic league appearances and goals as of 23:18, 24 September 2019 (UTC)

José Diogo Macedo da Silva (born 3 February 1994), known as Didi, is a Portuguese footballer who plays for Vitória Guimarães B as a midfielder.

== Club career ==
Born in Guimarães, Didi spent his youth career at Vitória de Guimarães, where he started in 2008. In 2013, he joined Benfica B but did not play any match in Segunda Liga, before moving to Braga in the next season.

On 8 December 2014, Didi made his professional debut with Braga B in a 2014–15 Segunda Liga match against Sporting Covilhã.
