= Kayhan Space =

Aerospace software company

Kayhan Space Corp.
- Industry: Space Situational Awareness
- Founded: 2019; 7 years ago
- Founder: Araz Feyzi (CTO); Siamak Hesar (CEO)
- Products: Pathfinder; Gamut; Eagle
- Website: https://www.kayhan.space/

Kayhan Space Corp. doing business as Kayhan Space is an American space technology company based in Boulder, Colorado. Founded in 2019, their products have been centered on space-related activities. Focusing on space awareness, Kayhan Space has made products such as Pathfinder for dodging space debris and other satellites.

== History ==
Kayhan Space was founded in 2019 by Siamak Hesar and Araz Feyzi, immigrants to the US and both naturalized U.S. citizens for over 10 years. Hesar holds a Ph.D. in Aerospace Engineering from the University of Colorado, Boulder with a focus on precise orbit determination. He has supported several NASA missions in the past, most notably as a radio science working group (RSWG) team member for the OSIRIS-REx asteroid sample return mission while at NASA's Jet Propulsion Laboratory. Feyzi is a co-founder of Syfer, an internet device security company.

On December 14, 2021, Kayhan Space announced that $3.7 million was raised in seed funding.

On September 28, 2022, Kayhan Space along with Astroscale and the University of Texas at Austin, won a Small Business Technology Transfer Phase 1 award. The award, worth $250,000, is under the Orbital Prime program, which is run by the technology division of the United States Space Force. The award is contracted to aerospace small business companies that work with academic or nonprofit organizations.

On September 19, 2023, Kayhan Space announced a subsequent $7 million financing that brought the companies total venture capital funding raised to $10.7 million.

== Products ==
=== Pathfinder ===
Pathfinder is a subscription-based software designed to help space companies perform their missions without worrying and countering orbital debris and other damaging objects from affecting missions. Major customers of Pathfinder include Capella Space, Lynk Global and Globalstar.

=== Eagle ===
Eagle is a software for orbit simulation and model for Low Earth Orbit, Geostationary orbit, and Interplanetary orbits.

=== Gamut ===
Gamut is a software to prevent debris collisions in launch trajectories, and submitting trajectories to the government for approval.

=== Proxima ===
Announced in 2022, Proxima is being built in cooperation with Astroscale and University of Texas at Austin, it is an enhancement of Astroscale's current system for rendezvous and proximity operations. It allows for minimal manual support for safe close-distance maneuvers.
