= Ditty =

Ditty is a surname. Notable people with the surname include:

- Herbert Ditty (died 1998), Ulster Unionist politician and Lord Mayor of Belfast, Northern Ireland
- James S. Ditty (1880–1962), American photo-engraver and entrepreneur
- Julie Ditty (born 1979), American tennis player

== See also ==
- Diddy (disambiguation)
