= Invincible D-D =

D-D

General information
- Type: Three/four-seat cabin monoplane
- National origin: US
- Manufacturer: Invincible Metal Furniture Co
- Designer: Irl Beach
- Number built: 1

History
- First flight: February 1929

The Invincible D-D was a prototype three/four seat touring aircraft, built in the US in 1929. One example flew but development was ended by the Great Depression.

== Design and development ==
The D-D was a mid-wing monoplane with a rectangular plan, blunt tipped, constant thickness wing. Canvas covered, it was built around a pair of wooden spars that continued through the fuselage with the pilot's seat between them. Dihedral was 1.25°. Constant chord ailerons filled the outer two-thirds of the trailing edge. The wings were braced with steel V-struts, individually enclosed in wooden fairings, from the two wing spars to a framework under the fuselage where their vertices were transversely joined by a horizontal steel bar.

The Invincible was designed to accept two engines of significantly different power and cost. These were the 67 kW (90 hp) LeBlond 90-7D, a seven-cylinder radial engine or the 130 kW (170 hp) Curtiss Challenger, a six-cylinder, two row radial. The Challenger-powered version could carry four, one more than that with the Leblond engine, but cost $7,800 rather than $5,500. The chosen engine was mounted in the nose with cylinders largely exposed for cooling; the mounting allowed easy interchange between the two types. Fuel tanks were in the wings.

Behind the engine the Invincible's fuselage had a steel tube, rectangular-section structure with fabric covering. The enclosed cabin had, in the four-seater, two rows of side-by-side seats, optional dual control and generous forward, side and upward glazing. Entry was via an oval port-side door.

Its tailplane, triangular in plan, was mounted on top of the fuselage and carried separate, parallel chord elevators. It was wire-braced from above and below to the rudder post of a quadrantal profile fin which carried a constant chord rudder, reaching down to the keel.

The Invincible's fixed, tailwheel landing gear had mainwheels independently mounted on cranked half-axles hinged at the centre of the fuselage underside. Their outer ends were joined to the fuselage sides by inward-leaning pneumatic shock absorber struts and to the ends of the horizontal bar of the wing struttage by short drag struts.

Its first flight was in late January-early February 1929 at Manitowoc, powered by the LeBlond engine and piloted by William Williams, with its designer, Irl Beach, as a passenger. It was scheduled to appear at the Detroit air show that April. Invincible, having entered into aviation in 1928 and produced three or four different prototypes, left the industry in 1929 because of the Great Depression.

== Specifications (LeBlond engine) ==
Data from Les Ailes, July 1929

General characteristics

- Crew: One
- Capacity: Two passengers
- Length: 7.34 m (24 ft 1 in)
- Wingspan: 11.60 m (38 ft 1 in)
- Height: 2.21 m (7 ft 3 in)
- Wing area: 20.26 m^{2} (218.1 sq ft)
- Aspect ratio: 6.7
- Airfoil: NACA M 15
- Empty weight: 585 kg (1,290 lb)
- Fuel capacity: 228 L (50 imp gal; 60 US gal)
- Powerplant: 1 × LeBlond 90-7D 7-cylinder radial, 67 kW (90 hp) at 1,975 rpm
- Propellers: 2-bladed

Performance

- Maximum speed: 175 km/h (109 mph, 94 kn)
- Cruise speed: 145 km/h (90 mph, 78 kn)
- Stall speed: 59 km/h (37 mph, 32 kn)
