= Dede Indra Permana Soediro =

Indonesian politician (born 1982)

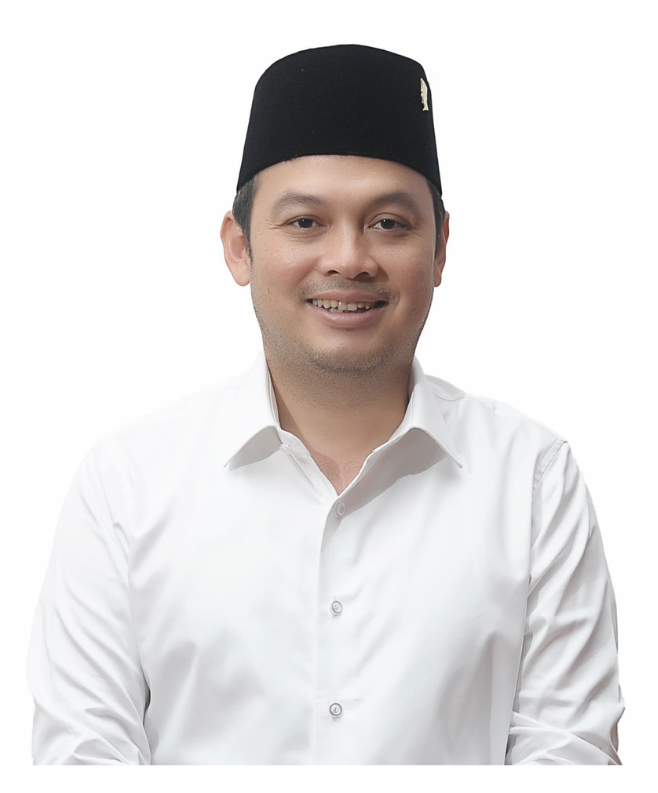
- Dede Indra Permana Soediro in 2025

Member of the House of Representatives
- Incumbent
- Assumed office 1 October 2019
- Constituency: West Java X

Personal details
- Born: 9 June 1982 (age 43)
- Party: Indonesian Democratic Party of Struggle

Dede Indra Permana Soediro (born 9 June 1982) is an Indonesian politician serving as a member of the House of Representatives since 2019. From 2014 to 2019, he was a member of the Regional House of Representatives of Central Java.
