= Didi (Angolan footballer) =

Angolan football player

Personal information
- Full name: Carlos Viegas
- Date of birth: 14 November 1975 (age 50)
- Place of birth: Luanda, Angola
- Position: Defender

Senior career*
Years	Team	Apps	(Gls)
1996–1999	Atlético Sport Aviação		
2000–2005	Petro de Luanda		

International career
1999–2001	Angola	15	(0)
- * Club domestic league appearances and goals

Carlos Viegas (born 14 November 1975), known as Didí, is an Angolan former footballer who played as a defender for Atlético Sport Aviação and Petro de Luanda. He made 15 appearances for the Angola national team.

== Career statistics ==
Appearances and goals by national team and year
National team	Year	Apps	Goals
Angola	1999	4	0
Angola	2000	1	0
Angola	2001	10	0
Total		15	0
