= TMC8 =

Protein-coding gene in the species Homo sapiens

Identifiers
- Aliases: TMC8, EV2, EVER2, EVIN2, transmembrane channel like 8
- External IDs: OMIM: 605829; MGI: 2669037; GeneCards: TMC8

Gene location (Human)
Chr.	Chromosome 17 (human)
Band	17q25.3	Start	78,130,770 bp
Band	17q25.3	End	78,142,968 bp

Gene location (Mouse)
Chr.	Chromosome 11 (mouse)
Band	11|11 E2	Start	117,672,902 bp
Band	11|11 E2	End	117,683,936 bp
RNA expression pattern
Bgee	Human / Mouse (ortholog); Top expressed in: granulocyte; spleen; appendix; lymph node; blood; thymus; mucosa of ileum; bone marrow cell; monocyte; superficial temporal artery / Top expressed in: granulocyte; thymus; yolk sac; blood; morula; embryo; blastocyst; stomach; transitional epithelium of urinary bladder; tail of embryo; More reference expression data
BioGPS	n/a
Gene ontology
Molecular function	signaling receptor binding; protein binding; ion channel activity; mechanosensitive ion channel activity
Cellular component	cytoplasm; integral component of membrane; Golgi apparatus; nuclear membrane; extracellular exosome; endoplasmic reticulum membrane; endoplasmic reticulum; membrane; extracellular space; integral component of plasma membrane
Biological process	negative regulation of protein oligomerization; regulation of extrinsic apoptotic signaling pathway via death domain receptors; zinc ion homeostasis; ion transport; negative regulation of protein binding; regulation of cell growth; transport; ion transmembrane transport; transmembrane transport
Sources:Amigo / QuickGO
Orthologs
Databases	NCBI: entry; OMA: entry
Species	Human	Mouse
Entrez	147138	217356
Ensembl	ENSG00000167895	ENSMUSG00000050106
UniProt	Q8IU68	Q7TN58
RefSeq (mRNA)	NM_152468	NM_001195088; NM_001195089; NM_001195090; NM_181856
RefSeq (protein)	NP_689681	NP_001182017; NP_001182018; NP_001182019; NP_862904
Location (UCSC)	Chr 17: 78.13 – 78.14 Mb	Chr 11: 117.67 – 117.68 Mb
PubMed search
- Wikidata
View/Edit Human	View/Edit Mouse

Transmembrane channel-like protein 8 is a protein which in humans is encoded by the TMC8 gene.

== Function ==
The protein encoded by this gene is an integral membrane protein that localize to the endoplasmic reticulum and is predicted to form transmembrane channels. This gene encodes a transmembrane channel-like protein with 8 predicted transmembrane domains and 3 leucine zipper motifs.

== Clinical significance ==
Mutations in the TMC8 gene are associated with epidermodysplasia verruciformis (EV), an autosomal recessive dermatosis characterized by abnormal susceptibility to human papillomaviruses (HPVs) and a high rate of progression to squamous cell carcinoma on sun-exposed skin.
