= Hasan Sadikin Hospital =

Dr. Hasan Sadikin Central General Hospital
- Ministry of Health

Geography
- Location: Jalan Pasteur 38, Pasteur, Sukajadi, Bandung, West Java, Indonesia
- Coordinates: 6°53′53″S 107°35′54″E

Organisation
- Care system: Public
- Type: District General, Teaching
- Affiliated university: Padjadjaran University

Services
- Beds: 929

History
- Former names: Het Algemeene Bandoengsche Ziekenhuis; Gemeente Ziekenhuis Juliana; RS Rancabadak
- Opened: October 15, 1923; 102 years ago

Links
- Website: web.rshs.or.id
- Lists: Hospitals in Indonesia

Dr. Hasan Sadikin Central General Hospital (Rumah Sakit Umum Pusat Dr. Hasan Sadikin, abbreviated as RSHS) is a public hospital in Bandung, West Java, Indonesia located in Jalan Pasteur 38, Sukajadi, Bandung. The hospital is organized as a "general service agency" (Badan Layanan Umum, BLU) and formerly a "service company" (Perusahaan Jawatan, Perjan).

== History ==
The hospital was built during Dutch colonial era since 1920 with initial 300 bed capacity, and opened on 15 October 1923 as the Central Bandung Hospital (Het Algemeene Bandoengsche Ziekenhuis). In 1927 its name was changed into Juliana City Hospital (Gemeente Ziekenhuis Juliana), probably named after Princess Juliana. During Japanese occupation, the hospital was converted into military hospital named Rigukun Byoin. After Indonesia proclaimed its independence and the revolution broke out, the hospital was controlled again by the Dutch, but only reverted as a general hospital in 1948 and then handed to Indonesian control. dr. H.R. Paryono Suriodipuro set as the first Indonesian director in 1949.

The hospital name then changed to Rantja Badak Hospital (Rumah Sakit Rantja Badak), due to its location in Rancabadak village. In 1954, by the Department of Health's approve, Rantja Badak Hospital was upgraded into provincial hospital, and was upgraded into national-level central hospital two years later; the bed capacity was also increased into 600. On 8 October 1967, Rantja Badak Hospital changed its name again into Dr. Hasan Sadikin Hospital as a homage to Hasan Sadikin, a former director and dean of Faculty of Medicine of Padjadjaran University who died in office on 16 July 1967.
