= Lee Thayer =

American mystery novelist

- Born: Emma Redington Thayer; 5 April 1874; Troy, Pennsylvania
- Died: 18 November 1973 (aged 99); San Diego, California
- Resting place: El Camino Memorial Park
- Occupations: Book Jacket Artist, Mystery Novelist
- Writing career
- Pen name: Lee Thayer

Emma Redington Thayer (April 5, 1874 – November 18, 1973) was an American artist and writer of mystery novels under the pseudonym of Lee Thayer.

== Biography ==
Emma Redington Lee was born April 5, 1874. She studied at Cooper Union and Pratt Institute. Her husband was Harry Thayer, an artist.

Thayer wrote 60 mystery novels about well-mannered private investigator Peter Clancy and his valet, Wiggar. She wrote her first novel, The Mystery of the Thirteenth Floor in 1919. Her last novel, Dusty Death, was published in 1966, when she was 92.

Thayer and her husband opened a publisher's art service, which specialized in book jacket art work.

On May 11, 1958, Thayer was a contestant on What's My Line?.

== Partial Bibliography ==
- The Mystery of the Thirteenth Floor. 1919.
- The Unlatched Door. 1920.
- That Affair at the Cedars. 1921.
- Q.E.D.. 1922.
- The Sinister Mark. 1923.
- The Key. 1924.
- Doctor S.O.S.. 1925.
- Poison. 1926.
- Alias Dr. Ely. 1927.
- The Darkest Spot. 1928.
- They Tell No Tales. 1930.
- The Last Shot. 1931.
- Set a Thief. 1931.
- The Glass Knife. 1932.
- The Scrimshaw Millions. 1932.
- Hell-Gate Tides. 1933.
- Counterfeit. 1933.
- Second Bullet. 1934.
- Dead Storage. 1934.
- Sudden Death. 1935.
- Dead End Street. 1935.
- Dark of the Moon. 1936.
