= Ahmet Kayhan Dede =

Turkish Islamic scholar (1898–1998)

- Born: 1898; Pütürge, Malatya, Ottoman Empire
- Died: August 3, 1998 (aged 99–100)

Ahmet Kayhan Dede (1898, Pütürge, Malatya – August 3, 1998) was a Turkish Sufi master.

== Books by Ahmet Kayhan ==
All books by Ahmet Kayhan were in the Turkish language.

- Âdem ve Âlem (“Man and Universe”) (1989)
- Ruh ve Beden (“Spirit and Body”) (1991)
- Aradığımı Buldum (“I Found What I Was Looking For”) (1992)
- İrfan Okulunda Oku (“Study in the School of Wisdom”) (1994)

These books are anthologies of essays, poems, book excerpts and condensed books. A selection from these in English can be found in Henry Bayman's The Meaning of the Four Books.

== Books about Ahmet Kayhan ==
The Biography of Ahmet Kayhan is written by Henry Bayman: The Teachings of a Perfect Master: An Islamic Saint for the Third Millennium published in 2012 by Anqa Publishing, ISBN 190593744X.

Other books published posthumously about Ahmet Kayhan and his teachings are:

- Hacı Ahmet Kayhan: Sohbetler (Kayhan Berişler et al., 2011, revised and expanded from an earlier 2007 edition). This is basically a transcription of the Master's Friday discourses.
- Ayşe Serap Avanoğlu, Veiled Islam: A Deconstructive Sufi Formation, Unpublished Master's thesis submitted to METU Dept. of Social Anthropology, 2012. Deals with an educated urban middle-class cross-section of the Master's disciples.
- Henry Bayman, The Station of No Station: Open Secrets of the Sufis (2001) North Atlantic Books. ISBN 1556432402
- Henry Bayman, The Secret of Islam: Love and Law in the Religion of Ethics (2003) North Atlantic Books. ISBN 1556434324
- Henry Bayman, The Black Pearl: Spiritual Illumination In Sufism and East Asian Philosophies (2005) Monkfish Book Publishing. ISBN 0974935956

== See also ==
- Naqshbandi
