= Marmorata =

Marmorata (from the Latin marmor for "marble") can refer to several different species or conditions presenting with a marbled appearance, including:

- Salmo marmoratus, marble trout
- Acronicta marmorata, marble dagger moth
- Synodontis marmorata, a catfish
- Pleurodema marmorata, a frog
- Cutis marmorata telangiectatica congenita, a disease
