= Jordan's syndrome =

Rare neurodevelopmental disorder

- Other names: PPP2R5D-related intellectual disability, mental retardation, autosomal dominant 35(MRD35)
- Specialty: Psychiatry, pediatrics, occupational medicine, neurology, ophthalmology
- Symptoms: Mild to severe global developmental delay, seizure, macrocephaly, hypotonia, autism, dysmorphic facial features
- Duration: Lifelong
- Causes: Heterozygous PPP2R5D mutation
- Diagnostic method: Molecular genetic testing
- Differential diagnosis: Cowden syndrome, Sotos syndrome, Smith-Kingsmore syndrome, M-CM, MPPH, 9q34 deletion syndrome, 16p11.2 deletion syndrome
- Management: Occupational therapy, physical therapy, speech therapy, applied behavior analysis
- Frequency: 23 (2019)

Jordan's syndrome (JS) or PPP2R5D-related intellectual disability is a rare autosomal dominant neurodevelopmental disorder caused by de novo mutations in the PPP2R5D gene. Children with JS may also have epilepsy or meet criteria for diagnosis with autism spectrum disorder. Also see Houge-Janssens Syndrome as 2R5D is a subunit of protein phosphatase type 2A (PP2A).

== Signs and symptoms ==
Symptoms of Jordan's syndrome (JS) are not formally defined but typically appear in early childhood and can range from mild to severe global developmental delay and intellectual disability, usually including speech delay and impairment. Patients with JS may meet some or all criteria for diagnosis with autism spectrum disorder due to many shared developmental symptoms. Initial clinical findings may include macrocephaly, hypotonia, epilepsy, ophthalmologic abnormalities, and dysmorphic facial features. Magnetic resonance imaging may further reveal megalencephaly or defects of the ventricles or white matter. Individuals with JS may also have skeletal, cardiac, endocrine, or genital abnormalities. Certain JS mutations can also cause early-onset parkinsonism between ages 20 and 40.

== Genetics ==
All cases of JS are caused by de novo missense point mutations in PPP2R5D, which encodes a subunit of the enzyme PP2A. At least eight pathogenic mutations have been identified: E197K, E198K, E200K, E420K, P201R, W207R, Q211P, and P53S.

Patients are exclusively diagnosed with JS upon discovery of a pathogenic variant of PPP2R5D via genetic testing. As of 2019, at least 23 individuals with JS have been reported.

== Mechanisms ==
The molecular mechanisms underlying JS are unknown. Broadly, PP2A dysfunction is known to be associated with other pathologies such as Alzheimer's disease, Parkinson's disease, and cancer. Studies of specific JS-causing variants such as E420K have implicated PI3K/AKT/mTOR pathway dysregulation in JS pathogenesis.

== Diagnosis ==
Jordan's syndrome is diagnosed through molecular genetic testing, most commonly exome sequencing.

== Research ==
PPP2R5D-related intellectual disability was named "Jordan's syndrome" after Jordan Lang, who was diagnosed by whole exome sequencing in 2014. Lang's parents founded the charitable organization Jordan's Guardian Angels to connect families of individuals with JS. The foundation also funds PPP2R5D research, spanning diverse model systems from alpacas and fruit flies to patient-derived induced pluripotent stem cells. Ten primary investigators are affiliated with the foundation:

- Wendy Chung (Columbia University)
- Kyle Fink (University of California, Davis)
- Richard Honkanen (University of South Alabama)
- Veerle Janssens (Katholieke Universiteit Leuven)
- Ghayda Mirzaa (Seattle Children's Hospital)
- Jan Nolta (University of California, Davis)
- Stefan Strack (University of Iowa)
- Brian Wadzinski (Vanderbilt University)
- Houhui Xia (University of Rochester)
- Yongna Xing (McArdle Laboratory)
