= Megalencephaly =

- Other names: Macrencephaly
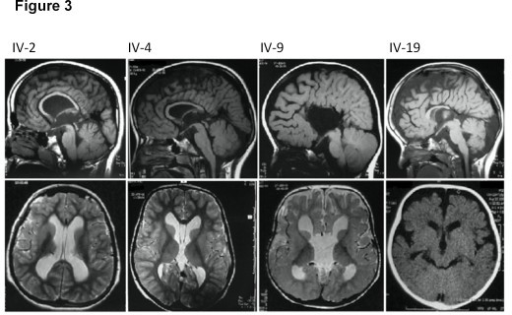
- MRI images showing megalencephaly in four family members who all have unusually large skulls (the family is affected by an autosomal recessive syndrome caused by a KIF7 mutation that induces multiple epiphyseal dysplasia)
- Specialty: Medical genetics, neurology, pediatrics
- Usual onset: Congenital
- Duration: Long-term

Megalencephaly (or macrencephaly; abbreviated MEG) is a growth development disorder in which the brain is abnormally large. It is characterized by a brain with an average weight that is 2.5 standard deviations above the mean of the general population. Approximately 1 out of 50 children (2%) are said to have the characteristics of megalencephaly in the general population.

A mutation in the PI3K-AKT pathway is believed to be the primary cause of brain proliferation and ultimately the root cause of megalencephaly. This mutation has produced a classification of brain overdevelopment that consists of two syndromes including megalencephaly-capillary malformation (MCAP) and megalencephaly-polydactyly-polymicrogyria-hydrocephalus (MPPH). Megalencephaly is usually diagnosed at birth and is confirmed with an MRI.

There are several neuropsychiatric disorders linked with megalencephaly; however, studies have shown that autism is the most prevalent association with the malformation of MEG. Although no treatment currently exists for megalencephaly, management methods are focused at reducing deficits linked with autism. Most recent research is targeted at creating inhibitors to reduce the mutational pathway that causes megalencephaly.

== Classification ==
=== Macrocephaly ===
Macrocephaly is a term used to refer to a person who has an abnormally large head. The circumference of the head must be above the 97th percentile or at least 2 standard deviations from the mean of normal weight and gender groups, according to the World Health Organization recommendations. A person with macrocephaly does not necessarily indicate that megalencephaly is also present. Large skulls usually exhibit no neurodevelopment conditions at all, meaning most individuals with macrocephaly are healthy.

=== Hemimegalencephaly ===
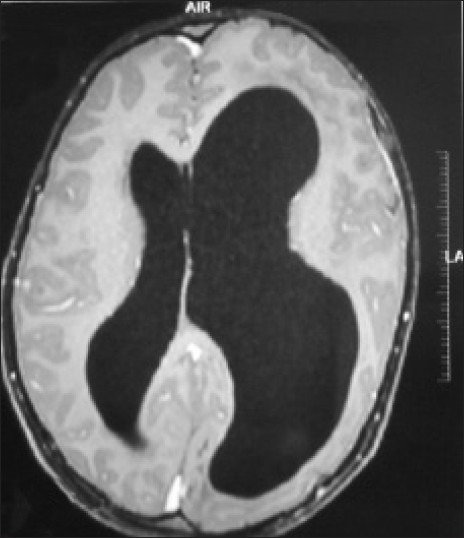
Left-sided hemimegalencephaly in a person with neurofibromatosis

Hemimegalencephaly is an extremely rare form of macrocephaly and is characterized by uneven development of brain hemispheres (one half of the brain is larger than the other). It can present by itself or in association with phakomatosis or hemigigantism. Additionally, hemimegalencephaly will frequently cause severe epilepsy, focal neuro-logical deficits, macrocrania, and mild to severe intellectual disability.

=== MCAP ===
Megalencephaly-capillary (MCAP) is one of the two major syndromes of megalencephaly. Typically, MCAP and MPPH can be distinguished by somatic features. MCAP includes many characteristics that are observed at birth including: cutaneous vascular malformations, especially capillary malformations of the face and cutis marmorata, polydactyly, connective tissue dysplasia, and focal or segmental body overgrowth. Furthermore, MCAP can occasionally be linked with asymmetric brain overgrowth (hemimegalencephaly) as well as segmental overgrowth of the body (hemihypertrophy).

=== MPPH ===
Megalencephaly-polymicrogyria-polydactyly-hydrocephalus (MPPH) is one of the two major syndromes contributing to megalencephaly. Typically MCAP and MPPH can be distinguished by somatic features. In differentiation to MCAP, MPPH lacks consistent somatic features other than postaxial polydactyly. Furthermore, brain and body development is normally symmetric in the majority of patients that appear to have MPPH symptoms.

== Presentation ==
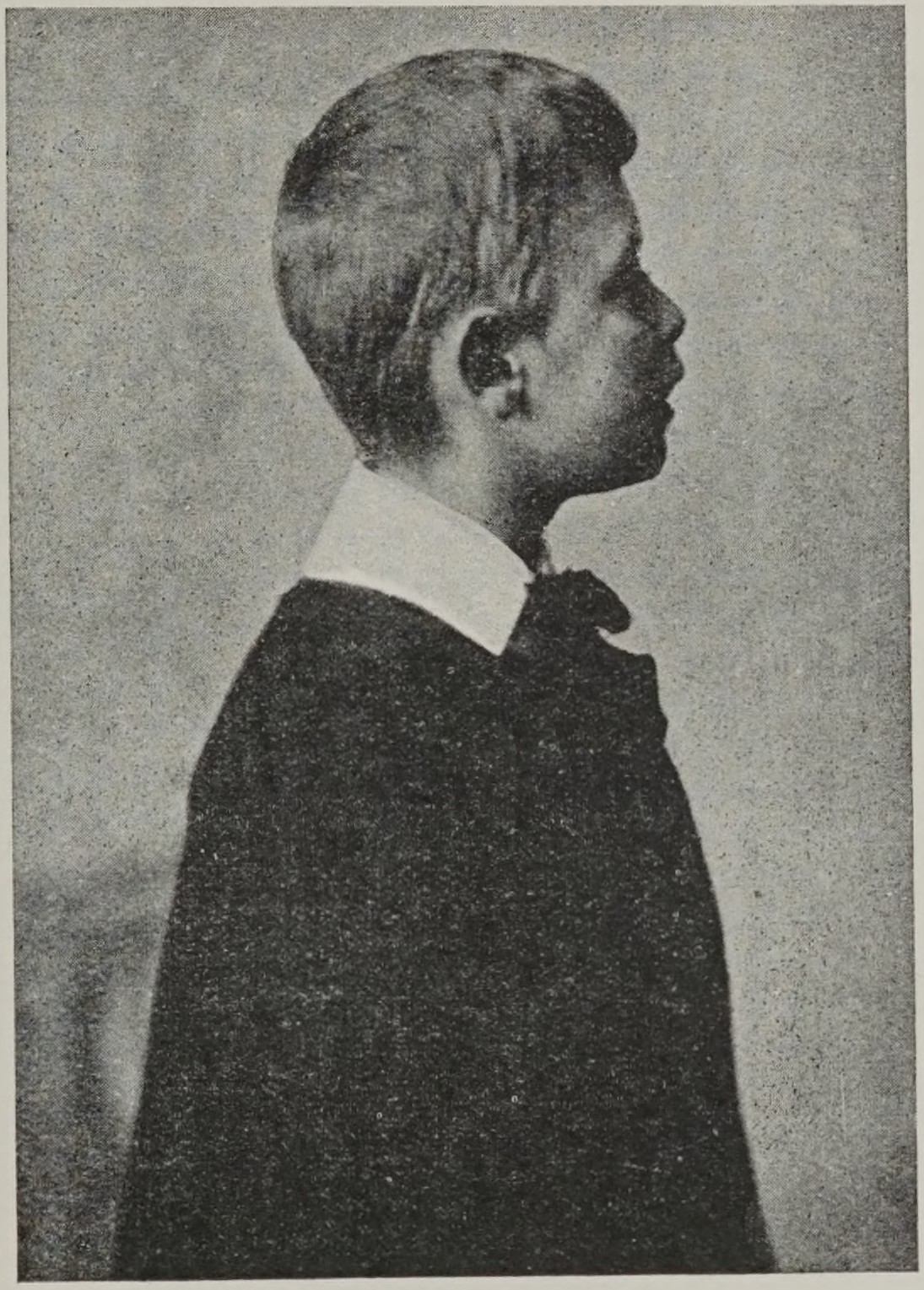
“Imbecile” with megalencephaly, head circumference 29 inches

=== Autism ===
There is an extremely high association between megalencephaly and autism. Approximately 20% of autistic children have megalencephaly, making it the most common physical characteristic of autism. People who present both megalencephaly and autistic characteristics usually also show signs of hyperactivity as a major symptom. However, there is no definitive evidence that autism is the primary cause/result of megalencephaly.

Since most children with megalencephaly also have autism, the goal of treatment for MEG is focused on managing the signs and symptoms associated with autism.

=== Other associations ===
Megalencephaly is also seen in the following conditions:

- Achondroplasia
- Acrocephalosyndactyly type I
- Chromosome 4Q32.1-q32.2 triplication syndrome
- Craniometadiaphyseal dysplasia wormian bone type
- Curry-Jones syndrome
- Early-onset parkinsonism-intellectual disability syndrome
- Intellectual disability, autosomal recessive 34
- Macrocephaly, dysmorphic facies, and psychomotor retardation
- Macrocephaly-intellectual disability-neurodevelopmental disorder-small thorax syndrome
- Macrocephaly/megalencephaly syndrome, autosomal recessive
- Megalencephalic leukoencephalopathy with subcortical cysts
- Megalencephaly with dysmyelination
- Megalencephaly, autosomal dominant
- Megalencephaly-capillary malformation-polymicrogyria syndrome
- Megalencephaly-polymicrogyria-polydactyly-hydrocephalus syndrome 1 and 3
- Polyhydramnios, megalencephaly, and symptomatic epilepsy
- Pseudoaminopterin syndrome
- Severe achondroplasia-developmental delay-acanthosis nigricans syndrome

== Causes ==
Although very little is still known as to the direct cause of megalencephaly, recent studies have begun to provide early indications of possible sources for its formation. Recent research has shown that there is a strong link between genetic pathways that cause brain develop and mutations in that pathway that result in brain overgrowth.

=== PI3K-AKT ===
Recent studies have shown that mutations in phosphoinositide 3-kinase (PI3K) and AKT (also known as protein kinase B) pathway have been identified in MCAP and MPPH. This pathway has proven to be an integral part of brain growth and development and is an area of interest to many researchers who study the cause of megalencephaly. Mutations in this pathway have been shown to cause a gain of function in the activation of the PI3K-AKT pathway. This cellular pathway is critical in the regulation of diverse cell functions including, cell growth, proliferation, metabolism, survival, apoptosis, angiogenesis, tumorigenesis and most importantly in regards to megalencephaly, brain development. AKT is a crucial signaling molecule part of the PI3K pathway and is also involved in many cellular functions. These functions include, brain development, synaptic plasticity and neurodevelopment. Loss of function in AKT can cause microcephaly in humans while inactivation of the pathway can cause hemimegalencephaly. There are also several cancers that have been shown to be linked with mutations in the AKT pathway, including melanoma and lung cancer.

=== Pur-alpha ===
Pur-alpha (purα) is a sequence-specific single-stranded DNA and RNA-binding protein. Studies have shown that the protein is primarily active during early development and is believed to have a role in brain enlargement. Although the exact function is still controversial, it is believed that pur-alpha is responsible for neuronal proliferation during neurogenesis as well as the maturation of dendrites. Thus, pur-alpha is also considered a potential root cause of megalencephaly and brain overgrowth.

== Pathophysiology ==
One impact of megalencephaly is the complete lack of motor development. One medical study assessed three patients presenting megalencephaly who showed severely impaired motor and speech development as well as distinct facial abnormalities including skull bossing, a low nasal bridge and large eyes.

== Diagnoses ==
Diagnosis of megalencephaly has changed over the years, however, with the development of more advanced equipment, physicians have been able to confirm the disorder with better accuracy. Usually, a physical exam is first performed when characteristics of megalencephaly have appeared. This typically occurs at birth or during early child development. A physician will then take measurements in order to determine the head circumference. Then a family background will be recorded in order to determine if there has been a history of megalencephaly in the family.

A neurological exam will then be performed using the technology of an MRI machine in order to confirm the diagnosis of megalencephaly. These imaging tests give detailed information regarding brain size, volume asymmetry and other irregular developments linked with MCAP, MPPH and hemimegalencephaly.

There is also a strong correlation of epilepsy and megalencephaly and this can aid doctors in their diagnosis.

If a diagnosis of megalencephaly is confirmed, the child is referred to a specialist who focuses on managing the symptoms and improving lifestyle. Since megalencephaly is usually presented with autism, the goal of treatment is to improve deficiencies associated with autistic causes. Additionally, since each patient has unique symptoms, there is no one specific treatment method and therefore is heavily reliant on symptoms associated with an individual.

== Prevention ==
Since there are very few treatment methods focused on managing megalencephaly, future research is targeted at inhibiting mutation of the pathway. However, this next step could be met with several complications as understanding the underlying mechanism of the mutation is a difficult task. The genetic coding that initiates a single mutation is sporadic and patterns are hard to detect in many cases. Even though very little research has been done to create inhibitors of the PI3K-AKT pathway, several pharmaceutical companies have begun to focus their interests in designing a prevention method for this purpose.

== Treatment ==
There is currently no specific treatment for megalencephaly, however periodic head measurements may be assessed to determine the rate of brain growth. Those individuals who develop neurological disorders may be prescribed anti-epileptic drugs for seizures. Studies have shown that reducing epilepsy can increase cell apoptosis and reduce the proliferation of neurons that ultimately leads to brain overgrowth.

== Prognosis ==
The prognosis of megalencephaly depends heavily on the underlying cause and associated neurological disorders. Because the majority of megalencephaly cases are linked with autism, the prognosis is equivalent to the corresponding condition. Since hemimegalencephaly is associated with severe seizures, hemiparesis and intellectual disability, the result is a poor prognosis. In most cases, those diagnosed with this type of megalencephaly usually do not survive through adulthood.

== Epidemiology ==
Approximately one out of every 50 (2%) children in the general population are said to have megalencephaly. Additionally, it is said that megalencephaly affects 3–4 times more males than females. Those individuals that are classified with macrocephaly, or general head overgrowth, are said to have megalencephaly at a rate of 10–30% of the time.

== History ==
It is believed that megalencephaly was discovered in 1972. Prior to diagnoses that used MRI scanning as a way to confirm brain overgrowth, cases of megalencephaly were diagnosed by autopsy in which the physical brain was measured and weighed.

== Research ==
Future research is targeted at further understanding mutations and how they lead to MCAP and MPPH syndromes. The majority of studies of megalencephaly have included mice who present brain abnormalities and overgrowth. The next step is to move to clinical trials involving humans in order to determine the exact genetic mutation causing the sequences. Additionally, scientists and pharmaceutical companies have begun to show interest in mutation inhibition and designing preventative methods to eliminate the underlying cause of megalencephaly altogether.

== Other relations ==
Intracranial volume also affects this pathology, since it is related with the size of the brain.
