= Luc Calliauw =

Belgian physician and university teacher (1928–2021)

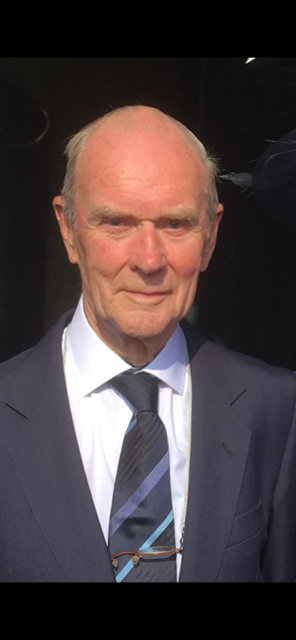
Luc Calliauw

Luc Calliauw (25 August 1928 in Bruges – 1 December 2021) was a Belgian physician and university professor.

== Early life ==
Calliauw was a son of Elza Bruynooghe and Raphael Calliauw, manager at the administrative services of the city of Bruges. After grammar school at the Royal Atheneum in Bruges, Calliauw studied at the University of Ghent, where in 1953 he received the degree of doctor in medical sciences. In 1960 he received homologation as a specialist in neurosurgery. He was married to Dr. Dora Hoeksema and they had three children.

In 1968 he obtained a doctor's degree at the University of Utrecht with a dissertation about hemispherectomy on human patients. He completed his military service as a physician within the Belgian Navy and rose to the rank of lieutenant colonel.

== Academic and surgical career ==
Calliauw was a brain surgeon, specialising in spinal marrow surgery and epilepsy. He also devoted part of his time to research, especially regarding brain tumors and their treatment. He combined his neurosurgical practice with his academic career.

From 1952 till 1955 he was an assistant of professor Corneel Heymans, Nobel Prize of Medicine recipient, at the Institute of Pharmacology and Therapy in Ghent. There he wrote the doctoral thesis About the Pharmacology of Protoveratrine A en B. From 1955 till 1963 he was assistant, head assistant and finally head of the neurosurgical clinic of Dr. H. Verbiest in Utrecht. In 1963 he founded and led the neurosurgical department of the Clinic Saint-John in Bruges. In 1979 he was appointed professor of neurosurgery at the University of Ghent and director (later chief of the department) of neurosurgery at the Academic Clinic of Ghent. In 1994 he retired and henceforth devoted himself to editorial work and to postgraduate formation of surgeons in Asia and Africa. From 2002 till 2007 he was professor at the University of Science in Malaysia. His influence upon the evolution of neurosurgery in Malaysia has been important, and has been nicknamed the 'Calliauwization' of the neurosurgical specialty. He was made an honorary member of the Neurosurgical Association of Malaysia.

== Professional organisations ==
Calliauw has been active within the world of neurosurgery. He was:

- secretary and vice president, later honorary president of the European Association of Neurosurgical Societies.
- editor in chief (1994–2002) of the Acta Neurochirurgica, the European magazine for neurosurgical physicians.
- honorary Vice President of the Academia Euroasiana Neurochirurgica
- member of the American Academy of Neurological Surgeons
- founding member and president of the Belgian Association of neurosurgeons
- founding member and president of the Association of Flemish neurologists
- founding member and vicepresident of the Belgian Association for the history of medicine
- secretary of the Union Européenne des Médecins Spécialistes, section neurochirurgie, in Brussels (1994–2000)

== Publications ==
Calliauw wrote several books, a number of chapters in collective works and more than a hundred scientific articles:

- Neurochirurgie voor de algemene practicus (in collaboration with J. Caemaert), Garant, Leuven & Apeldoorn, 1997. With a translation in Malaysian.
- Auditory function, vestibular function and opticinetic nystagmus after Hemispherectomy in Man

His articles include:

- Malignancy in Human Brain Tumours, (in collaboration with L. De Ridder), in : Liber Amicorum Braakman.
- Invasion of Humain Brain Tumours in vitro, (in collaboration with L. De Ridder), in: Journal of Neurosurgery, 1990.
- A simple Method for monitoring of Patency of Ventriculo-atrial Shunts: Transesophagical Echocardiography (in collaboration with other authors), in: Journal of Neurosurgery, 1991.
- Invasiveness in vitro and Clinical Evaluation of Meningiomas (in collaboration with L. De Ridder), in: Journal of Neurosurgery, 1992.
- Invasiveness of primary and secondary Brain Tumours in vitro correlated with Clinical Results (in collaboration with L. De Ridder), in: Journal of Neurosurgery, 1992.
- Transsternal Approach to Intraspinal Tumours in the upper Thoracic Region (in collaboration with other authors), in: Acta Neurochirurgica, 1994.
- In 1999 he gave in Warsaw the European lecture – state of art: Let us write a paper in which he developed critical considerations on the scientific literature dealing with neurosurgery, and with a preview of the future digital era.

== Honours ==
- In 1955 he was Laureate of the Belgian University Contest.
- In 1991 he received the 'Medal of Honour' of the European Association of Neurosurgical Societies, in recognition of his eminent contribution to the development of the European neurosurgery.
