= Aaron Cohen-Gadol =

American neurosurgeon

Aaron A. Cohen-Gadol
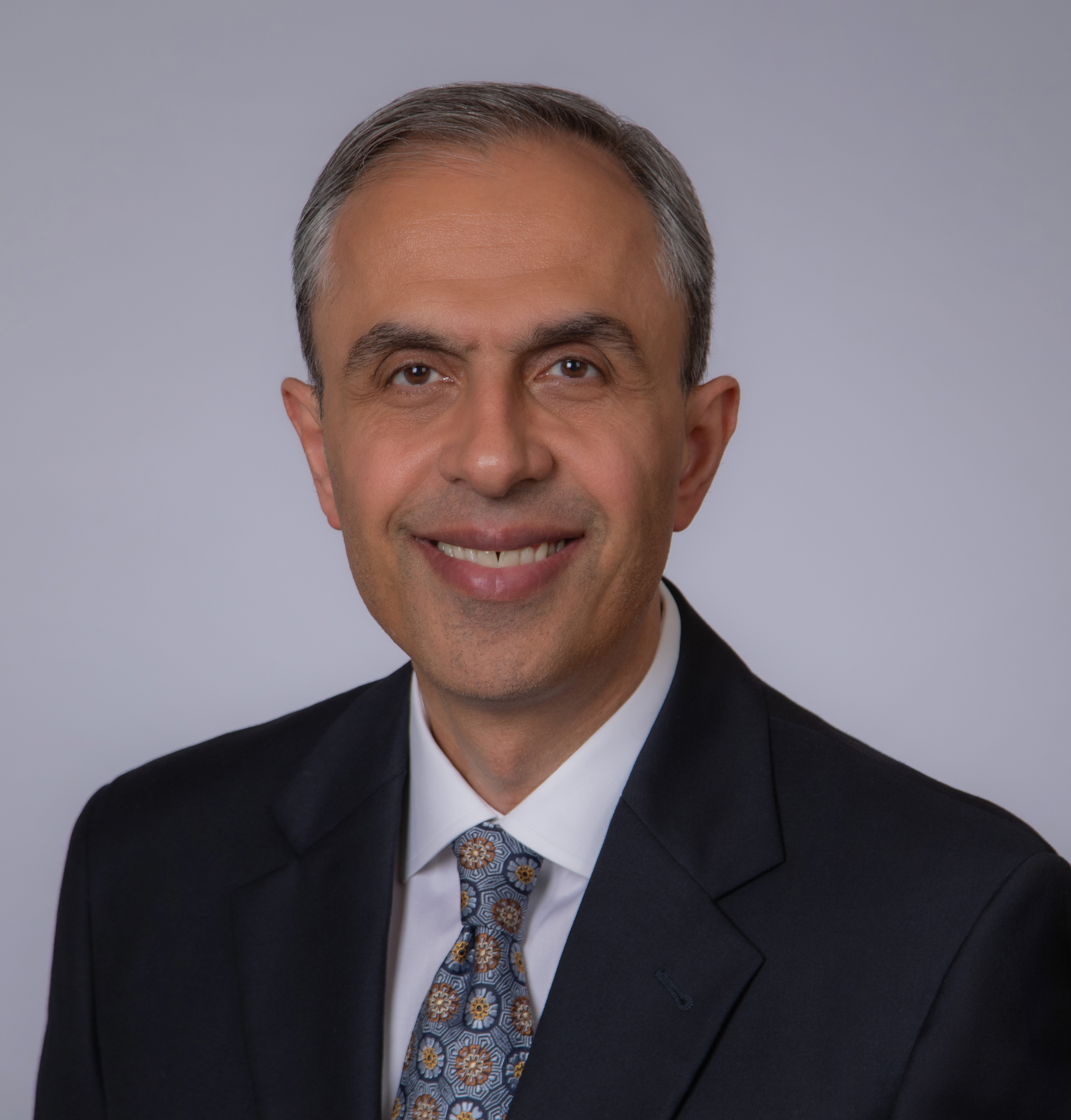
- Education: Keck School of Medicine of USC; University of California, San Diego
- Years active: 2006–present
- Medical career
- Profession: Neurosurgeon
- Institutions: ATLAS Institute of Brain and Spine Cedars-Sinai Medical Center; Saint John's Health Center Keck School of Medicine of USC; Indiana University School of Medicine; Indiana University Health
- Sub-specialties: Brain tumors Arteriovenous malformations Cavernous malformations Aneurysm; Microsurgery

Aaron A. Cohen-Gadol is an American neurosurgeon. He is the Founder and President of the ATLAS Institute of Brain and Spine, a neurosurgery group practice in Los Angeles, California. His current neurosurgical practice is based at Cedars-Sinai Medical Center and Providence Saint John's Health Center in Los Angeles, California.

In 2007, Cohen founded the Neurosurgical Atlas, a nonprofit organization, aimed at advancing the care of patients with neurosurgical disorders via introduction of novel and efficient surgical techniques into practice.

== Education ==
Cohen completed his B.A. in bioengineering and M.D. degrees from the University of California, San Diego and Keck School of Medicine of USC, respectively. Cohen completed his residency training in neurosurgery at Mayo Clinic in Rochester, Minnesota. He also completed advanced fellowship training in two subspecialties: epilepsy surgery (at Yale University) and skull base/cerebrovascular surgery (at University of Arkansas Medical Sciences) He also attained a master's degree in Clinical Research from Mayo Clinic Graduate School and an MBA from the Kelley School of Business.

== Academic career ==
In 2006, Cohen joined the Department of Neurosurgery at Indiana University School of Medicine, where he was a professor of neurological surgery. He was the Director of Neurosurgical Oncology and Brain Tumor Surgery at the Indiana University Department of Neurosurgery.

Cohen was the co-founder and co-director of the Center for the Cure of Glioblastoma, part of the Indiana University School of Medicine, which facilitates new treatment options for brain tumor patients by mentoring neuroscientists and researchers. He later moved to the Keck School of Medicine of USC.

Cohen serves as the associate editor-in-chief of Neurosurgical Focus, a journal in the field of neurosurgery. He has served on the board of directors of the American Association of Neurosurgeons (AANS) and the "Senior" Society of Neurological Surgeons (SNS). He is also a member of the American Academy of Neurological Surgery. Cohen has written and contributed to approximately 538 peer-reviewed publications.

=== Research and contributions ===
Cohen's research and contributions focus on brain surgery techniques for various conditions, including gliomas, meningiomas, complex tumors like skull base and acoustic neuromas, as well as cerebral aneurysms, arteriovenous malformations and disorders such as trigeminal neuralgia and emifacial spasm. Cohen has contributed to refining fluorescent technologies that enable brain tumors to "glow," making it easier for surgeons to precisely locate their margins for more effective removal.

=== The Neurosurgical Atlas ===
Cohen is the founder and current chief editor of the Neurosurgical Atlas (Atlas), a collection of text, intraoperative images, illustrations, and videos that document the most difficult aspects in surgery.

=== Atlas Meditech ===
Cohen is the founder of Atlas Meditech, a medical technology company focused on artificial intelligence applications in various specialties of medicine and surgery. One of the company's main products is AtlasGPT, a precision AI system for doctors and surgeons.

== Awards and honors ==
In 2009, Cohen was voted the Health Care Hero of the Year in the State of Indiana for advancements in health care. He was granted the Hemispherectomy Foundation's Humanitarian award and is co-chair of the foundation's Medical Advisory Board.

In 2022, Cohen received Vilhelm Magnus Medal, the award is presented to a neurosurgeon or neuroscientist in recognition of their contributions to the field of neurosurgery.

== Personal life ==
He volunteers to perform therapeutic surgery on dogs with brain tumors.
