= Cutis marmorata telangiectatica congenita =

- Other names: Van Lohuizen syndrome
- Cutis marmorata telangiectatica congenital is inherited in an autosomal recessive manner
- Specialty: Dermatology
- Frequency: 0.0001%

Cutis marmorata telangiectatica congenita (CMTC) is a rare congenital vascular disorder that usually manifests in affecting the blood vessels of the skin. The condition was first recognized and described in 1922 by Cato van Lohuizen, a Dutch pediatrician whose name was later adopted in the other common name used to describe the condition – Van Lohuizen syndrome. CMTC is also used synonymously with congenital generalized phlebectasia, nevus vascularis reticularis, congenital phlebectasia, livedo telangiectatica, congenital livedo reticularis and Van Lohuizen syndrome.

It should not be confused with the more general term "cutis marmorata", which refers to livedo reticularis caused by cold.

For a full and up-to-date description visit the CMTC webpages of the global non-profit patient organisation for people with CMTC and other vascular malformations CMTC-OVM: www.cmtc.nl/en

== Signs and symptoms ==
People with visible marks generally feel fine (physically) with age, as the disorder often is left as just markings after infancy, although cold temperatures or strong emotions like anxiety can cause a numb, cold pain in affected areas, and may result in bleeding, and when it is mentioned, they may become withdrawn and self-conscious. Some children may have low self-esteem due to the condition. CMTC is an uncommon, sporadic congenital vascular malformation characterized by a generalized or localized reticulated cutaneous vascular network.

Cutaneous lesions described in patients with CMTC include nevus flammeus, hemangioma, nevus anemicus, café-au-lait spots, melanocytic nevus, aplasia cutis and acral cyanosis.

It has a marbled bluish to deep-purple appearance. The dark skin lesions often show a palpable loss of dermal substance. The reticulated mottling frequently appears more prominent in a cold environment (physiologic cutis marmorata), but tends not to disappear with warming. Hence, the erythema may be worsened by cooling, physical activity, or crying. CMTC frequently involves the extremities, with the lower extremities involved most commonly, followed by the upper extremities, and then the trunk and face. The lower extremities often show atrophy and seldom show hypertrophy resulting in limb circumference discrepancy.

When located on the trunk, the lesions of CMTC tend to show mosaic distribution in streaks with a sharp midline demarcation seen across the abdomen. The lesions are primarily localized, but can be segmental or generalized, often unilateral in appearance. Diffuse involvement of the skin is usually not observed.

Although its course is variable, the majority of lesions in mild cases fade by adolescence. Ulceration and secondary infection are complications in severe cases and can be fatal if present in the neonatal period.

== Causes ==
Fewer than 100 cases of CMTC have been published worldwide. Petrozzi reported the first case of CMTC in the United States in 1970. CMTC is believed to be more common than suspected, as studies have shown that milder forms of the disease are not being recognized as CMTC.

The pathophysiology is still unclear, with most cases occurring sporadically, although rare cases were reported in families. Studies indicated the primary involvement of capillaries, venules and veins, and possibly also that of arterioles and lymphatics.

Hypotheses that have been proposed include: environmental/external factors; peripheral neural dysfunction; failure of the development of mesodermic vessels in an early embryonic stage; autosomal dominant inheritance with incomplete penetrance and, finally, the theory of Happle.

== Diagnosis ==
=== Differential diagnosis ===
During the first few weeks after birth, when the lesions are not very reticulated, CMTC may look very similar to vascular lesions such as port-wine stains. However, during follow-up, CMTC lesions become characteristic in their appearance. They must be differentiated from other causes of persistent reticulated vascular lesions, such as those in the following table:

Diseases	Characteristics
Diffuse phlebectasia	rare progressive harmartomatous malformation involving the deeper veins
Livedo reticularis associated with collagen-vascular disease	lace pattern of cyanotic skin discoloration secondary to dilation of subpapillary veinous plexi and occlusion of small vessels feeding the upper cutis
Neonatal lupus erythematosus	well-demarcated erythematous, mild-scaling plaque that is often annular and appears predominantly on the scalp, neck, or face
Nevus anemicus	congenital single patch manifested by skin pallor, most commonly seen on the trunk
Nevus flammeus (port-wine stain)	pale pink to red-purple, usually unilateral macules of the face or extremities
Physiologic cutis marmorata	reticulated mottling appearance of the skin that physiologically responds to cold environments
Primary antiphospholipid syndrome (APS)	increased tendency to form venous and/or arterial thromboses, often accompanied by thrombocytopenia in the presence of the antiphospholipid antibodies

=== Histology ===
Some patients have a few or no histopathologic abnormalities. Histological examination of a biopsy may show an increase in the number and size of capillaries and veins (rarely lymphatics), dilated capillaries located in the deeper dermis, and hyperplasia and swollen endothelial cells with occasional dilated veins and venous lakes.

=== Associated abnormalities ===
Associated abnormalities include the following:

- Body asymmetry (extremities; macrocephaly)
- Glaucoma
- Cutaneous atrophy
- Neurological anomalies
- Vascular anomalies (nevus flammeus, Sturge-Weber syndrome, Klippel-Trénaunay syndrome, Adams-Oliver syndrome)
- Psychomotor and/or mental retardation
- Chronic ulceration that can complicate long-term CMTC
- Chronic urticaria

== Treatment ==
In general, there is no treatment available for CMTC, although associated abnormalities can be treated. In the case of limb asymmetry, when no functional problems are noted, treatment is not warranted, except for an elevation device for the shorter leg.

Laser therapy has not been successful in the treatment of CMTC, possibly due to the presence of many large and deep capillaries and dilated veins. Pulsed-dye laser and long-pulsed-dye laser have not yet been evaluated in CMTC, but neither argon laser therapy nor YAG laser therapy has been helpful.

When ulcers develop secondary to the congenital disease, antibiotic treatment such as oxacillin and gentamicin administered for 10 days has been prescribed. In one study, the wound grew Escherichia coli while blood cultures were negative.

== Prognosis ==
The prognosis is favorable in most patients with an isolated cutaneous abnormality. In the majority of cases, both the vivid red marking and the difference in circumference of the extremities regress spontaneously during the first year of life. It is theorized that this may be due to the normal maturation process, with thickening of the epidermis and dermis. Improvements for some patients can continue for up to 10 years, while in other cases, the marbled skin may persist for the patient's lifetime.

One study reported an improvement in lesions in 46% of patients within three years. If CMTC persists into adulthood, it can result in complaints due to paresthesia, increased sensitivity to cold and pain, and the formation of ulcers.

Few reports included long-term follow up of CMTC into adolescence and adulthood. While about 50% of patients seem to show definite improvement in the reticular vascular pattern, the exact incidence and cause of persistent cases are unknown.

== Epidemiology ==
CMTC is observed at birth or shortly thereafter in 94% of patients. In other reports, however, patients did not develop skin lesions until three months or even two years after birth. Females are typically affected more often than males (64%).

== Eponym ==
It is named for Dr. Cato van Lohuizen.
