= Adams–Oliver syndrome =

- Other names: Congenital scalp defects with distal limb anomalies
- Specialty: Pediatrics, dermatology, orthopedic surgery
- Frequency: 0.0005%
- Named after: Forrest H Adams; Clarence Paul Oliver

Adams–Oliver syndrome (AOS) is a rare congenital disorder characterized by defects of the scalp and cranium (cutis aplasia congenita), transverse defects of the limbs, and mottling of the skin.

== Signs and symptoms ==
Two key features of AOS are aplasia cutis congenita with or without underlying bony defects and terminal transverse limb defects. Cutis aplasia congenita is defined as missing skin over any area of the body at birth; in AOS skin aplasia occurs at the vertex of the skull. The size of the lesion is variable and may range from solitary round hairless patches to complete exposure of the cranial contents. There are also varying degrees of terminal limb defects (for example, shortened digits) of the upper extremities, lower extremities, or both. Individuals with AOS may have mild growth deficiency, with height in the low-normal percentiles. The skin is frequently observed to have a mottled appearance (cutis marmorata telangiectatica congenita). Other congenital anomalies, including cardiovascular malformations, cleft lip and/or palate, abnormal renal system, and neurologic disorders manifesting as seizure disorders and developmental delay are sometimes observed. Variable defects in blood vessels have been described, including hypoplastic aortic arch, middle cerebral artery, pulmonary arteries. Other vascular abnormalities described in AOS include absent portal vein, portal sclerosis, arteriovenous malformations, abnormal umbilical veins, and dilated renal veins.

== Genetics ==
AOS was initially described as having autosomal dominant inheritance due to the reports of families with multiple affected family members in more than one generation. The severity of the condition can vary between family members, suggestive of variable expressivity and reduced penetrance of the disease-causing allele. Subsequently, it was reported that some cases of AOS appear to have autosomal recessive inheritance, perhaps with somewhat more severe phenotypic effects.

Six AOS genes have been identified: ARHGAP31, DOCK6, RBPJ, EOGT, NOTCH1, and DLL4. ARHGAP31 and DOCK6 are both regulatory proteins that control members of the Rho family of GTPases and specifically regulate the activity of Cdc42 and Rac1. Autosomal dominant mutations in ARHGAP31 (a GTPase-activating protein) and autosomal recessive mutations in DOCK6 (a guanine nucleotide exchange factor) cause an accumulation of the inactive GTPase and lead to defects of the cytoskeleton.

RBPJ, EOGT, NOTCH1 and DLL4 are all involved in the Notch signalling pathway. Mutations in EOGT are found in AOS with autosomal recessive inheritance; the other three genes account for cases with autosomal dominant inheritance.

== Mechanism ==
The precise mechanism underlying the congenital abnormalities observed in AOS is unknown. Similar terminal transverse limb anomalies and cardiovascular malformations are seen in animal models of hypoxic insults during the first trimester. Combined with the common association of cardiac and vascular abnormalities in AOS, it has been hypothesized that the spectrum of defects observed in AOS could be due to a disorder of vasculogenesis.

In rare cases, AOS can be associated with chromosomal translocations. A panel of candidate genes (including ALX4, ALX1, MSX1, MSX2, P63, RUNX2 and HOXD13) were tested but no disease-causing mutations were identified. More recently, mutations in six genes have been identified, highlighting the Rho family of GTPases and the Notch signalling pathway as important factors in the pathogenesis of AOS.

== Diagnosis ==
The diagnosis of AOS is a clinical diagnosis based on the specific features described above. A system of major and minor criteria was proposed.

Major features	Minor features
Terminal transverse limb defects	Cutis marmorata
Aplasia cutis congenita	Congenital heart defect
Family history of AOS	Vascular anomaly

The combination of two major criteria would be sufficient for the diagnosis of AOS, while a combination of one major and one minor feature would be suggestive of AOS. Genetic testing can be performed to test for the presence of mutation in one of the known genes, but these so far only account for an estimated 50% of patients with AOS. A definitive diagnosis may therefore not be achieved in all cases.

== Management ==
Management of AOS is largely symptomatic and aimed at treating the various congenital anomalies present in the individual. When the scalp and/or cranial bone defects are severe, early surgical intervention with grafting is indicated.

== Prognosis ==
The overall prognosis is excellent in most cases. Most children with Adams–Oliver syndrome can likely expect to have a normal life span. However, individuals with more severe scalp and cranial defects may experience complications such as hemorrhage and meningitis, leading to long-term disability.

== Epidemiology ==
AOS is a rare genetic disorder and the annual incidence or overall prevalence of AOS is unknown. Between 100-200 individuals with this disorder have been reported in the medical literature. It's estimated to affect approximately 1 in every 225,000 live births.

== History ==
AOS was first reported by the American pediatric cardiologist Forrest H. Adams and the clinical geneticist Clarence Paul Oliver in a family with eight affected members.
