= Early-onset parkinsonism-intellectual disability syndrome =

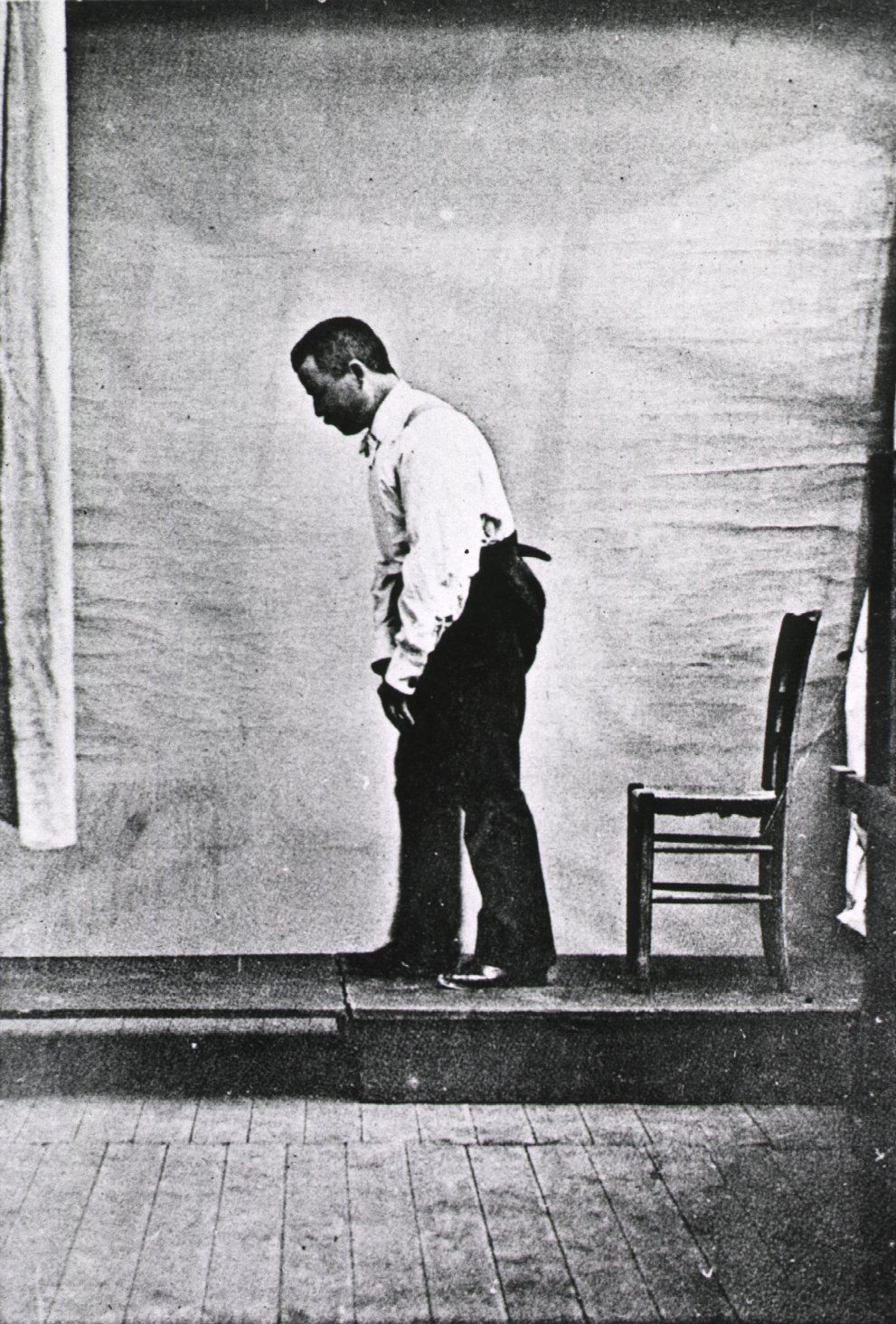
- Parkinsonian gait
- Specialty: Medical genetics
- Prognosis: Medium
- Frequency: very rare, more than 12 cases have been described in medical literature
- Deaths: -

Early-onset parkinsonism-intellectual disability syndrome is a very rare genetic disorder which is characterized by intellectual disabilities, psychomotor developmental delays, macrocephaly, and Parkinson's disease which starts before the age of 45 (early onset PD). Additional symptoms include epilepsy, strabismus, and frontal bossing.

== Causes ==
This disorder is either caused by alterations or deletions of the RAB39B gene in chromosome Xq28 which are inherited in an X-linked recessive manner.

== Epidemiology ==
More than 12 cases from 3 families from Australia and the U.S. have been described in medical literature.
