= Hemispherectomy =

Surgical removal of one hemisphere of the brain

- ICD-9-CM: 01.52
- MeSH: D038421

Hemispherectomy is a surgery that is performed by a neurosurgeon where an unhealthy hemisphere of the brain is disconnected or removed. There are two types: Functional hemispherectomy refers to a simple surgical disconnection of the diseased hemisphere so that it can no longer send signals to the rest of the brain and body. Anatomical hemispherectomy refers to actual physical removal of the diseased hemisphere from the skull. This surgery is mostly used as a treatment for medically intractable epilepsy, which is the term used when anti-seizure medications are unable to control seizures.

== History ==
The first anatomical hemispherectomy was performed and described in 1928 by American neurosurgeon Walter Dandy. This was done as an attempt to treat glioma, a brain tumor, and hemiplegia. The first known anatomical hemispherectomy performed as a treatment for intractable epilepsy was in 1938 by Kenneth McKenzie, a Canadian neurosurgeon. This marked a significant shift from tumor surgery toward the treatment of severe epilepsy.

In 1950, R.A. Krynauw in South Africa reported one of the earliest large case series in pediatric patients with infantile hemiplegia, demonstrating improvement in motor function, cognition, and seizure control. Despite these and other early successes, enthusiasm for the procedure declined by the late 1950s due to high rates of long-term complications such as superficial hemosiderosis, obstructive hydrocephalus, and progressive neurological decline. Oppenheimer and Griffith (1966) systematically described these adverse effects and highlighted the need for safer modifications.

In response, Theodore Rasmussen and others pioneered the functional hemispherectomy, which reduced the amount of brain tissue removed while disconnecting the epileptogenic hemisphere. This approach aimed to maintain seizure control while minimizing complications.

With advances in neuroimaging and perioperative monitoring, hemispherectomy regained prominence in the 1980s and 1990s, as outcomes became more predictable and patient selection improved. European surgeons, including Delalande and Villemure, further refined disconnective procedures such as peri-insular hemispherotomy and vertical parasagittal hemispherotomy, which have since been widely adopted at epilepsy centers worldwide.

Over time, terminology has also evolved: while "functional hemispherectomy" was initially widely used, contemporary surgical literature increasingly favors the term "hemispherotomy" to describe modern disconnective approaches with minimal resection.

Today, hemispherotomy techniques are regarded as the contemporary standard, associated with improved safety profiles and long-term seizure freedom in carefully selected patients.

== Nomenclature ==
There are two principal forms of hemispherectomy: anatomical and functional.

- Anatomical hemispherectomy involves removal of nearly the entire cerebral hemisphere, including all four lobes, with or without excision of the basal ganglia and thalamus.
- Functional hemispherectomy disables the diseased hemisphere by disconnecting its cortical and subcortical pathways while leaving much of the brain tissue in place and maintaining vascular supply. This approach is preferred in most modern centers because of its lower complication rates, although incomplete disconnection can result in seizure recurrence.

Another related procedure is hemidecortication, which removes only the cerebral cortex of one hemisphere while sparing deeper white matter and ventricular structures. It was initially developed as an attempt to reduce complications associated with full anatomical hemispherectomy.

In recent decades, the term "hemispherotomy" has been adopted to describe a group of modern disconnective surgeries that achieve functional isolation of the epileptogenic hemisphere with minimal brain removal. Variants such as the peri-insular hemispherotomy and vertical parasagittal hemispherotomy are now widely practiced, and are often considered the contemporary standard at major epilepsy centers.

Contemporary classification emphasizes the degree of functional disconnection rather than the absolute volume of tissue removed, reflecting the shift toward minimally invasive strategies. In clinical literature, the terms "functional hemispherectomy" and "hemispherotomy" are occasionally used interchangeably, although most modern authors reserve "hemispherotomy" for the newer disconnective approaches.

Emerging minimally invasive variations, including endoscope-assisted hemispherotomy, have been reported in select centers, though these remain experimental and are not yet considered standard of care. Systematic reviews indicate that seizure-free rates are similar across anatomical hemispherectomy, functional hemispherectomy, hemidecortication, and hemispherotomy (approximately 70–75%). However, hemispherotomy generally carries a more favorable complication profile. Recent ILAE surgical task force reports support hemispherotomy as the preferred modern terminology and technique in most cases.

== Candidates ==
The typical candidates for hemispherectomy are pediatric patients with drug-resistant epilepsy caused by extensive unilateral cerebral pathology. In these cases, seizures predominantly arise from one hemisphere, and medical therapy is ineffective. Although bilateral seizure activity may occasionally be observed, surgery can still be considered if one hemisphere is clearly the dominant source of seizures.Preoperative evaluation is comprehensive and usually includes prolonged video electroencephalography (EEG) and high-resolution magnetic resonance imaging (MRI). Additional studies such as functional MRI (fMRI), positron emission tomography (PET), and magnetoencephalography (MEG) are frequently employed to refine localization and lateralization of the epileptogenic focus.

Today, hemispherectomy is performed as a treatment for severe and intractable epilepsy, including for young children whose epilepsy has been found to be drug-resistant. The most common underlying etiologies include malformations of cortical development (MCD), perinatal stroke and Rasmussen's encephalitis. MCD is an umbrella term for a wide variety of developmental brain anomalies, including hemimegalencephaly and cortical dysplasia. Other less common underlying etiologies include hemiconvulsion-hemiplegia epilepsy syndrome and Sturge-Weber syndrome.

== Procedure ==
Patients often shave the area of the scalp that will be involved with the surgery. Patients undergo general anesthesia and are unconscious for the procedure. The surgical site is sterilized, after which the skin is incised. A substantial portion of the bone is removed, followed by incision of the dura, which is the outer covering of the brain. There are several blood vessels that have connections with both sides of the brain, and these are carefully identified and clipped in such a way that spares the healthy hemisphere. Ultimately, a bundle of fibers that connect both of the cerebral hemispheres, the corpus callosum, is removed which results in the functional separation of one hemisphere from the other. Portions of the cerebral lobes from the damaged side of the brain are removed, depending on the specific procedure being performed. The surgeon may leave some brain tissue, such as the thalamus or choroid plexus. After completing the resection, the surgical site is irrigated with saline, the brain covering called the dura is sutured back together, the bone that was removed is replaced and the skin is sutured. This surgery often takes four to five hours. Patients often spend a few nights in the hospital post-operatively, and they undergo physical and occupational therapy soon after the surgery.

== Potential complications ==
The most common complication from surgery is hydrocephalus, a condition in which fluid accumulates within the brain, and this is often treated with a shunt to divert the fluid away. The rate of shunts following surgery ranges from 14 to 23%. Other complications include wound complications, epidural hemorrhages, subdural hemorrhages, intraparenchymal hemorrhages, intracranial abscesses, meningitis, ventriculitis and venous thrombosis. Additional epilepsy surgery following hemispherectomy is rare (4.5%), but may be recommended if there is a residual connection between the two hemispheres that is causing frequent seizures. Mortality rates are low and estimated to be <1% to 2.2%. Most patients do not experience changes in cognition, but some individuals may be at risk. A visual deficit called contralateral homonymous hemianopsia is expected to occur in most patients, where the entire visual field contralateral to the removed hemisphere is lost. There is a risk of motor deficits, and this is variable. Other possible complications include infection, aseptic meningitis, hearing loss, endocrine problems and transient neurologic deficits such as limb weakness.

== Outcomes ==
Since seizures are the most common indication for hemispherectomy surgery, most research on hemispherectomy analyzes how the surgery affects seizures. Many patients undergoing surgery obtain good surgical outcomes, some obtaining complete seizure freedom (54–90%) and others having some degree of improvement in seizure burden. A recently developed scoring system has been proposed to help predict the probability of seizure freedom with more accuracy: HOPS (Hemispherectomy Outcome Prediction Scale). Although it cannot definitively predict surgical outcome with exact precision, some physicians may use it as a guide. The scoring system takes certain variables into consideration including age at seizure onset, history of prior brain surgery, seizure semiology and imaging findings.

There is also data pertaining to how hemispherectomy affects the body in other ways. After surgery, the remaining cerebral hemisphere is often able to take over some cognitive, sensory and motor functions. The degree to which the remaining hemisphere takes on this additional workload often depends on several factors, including the underlying etiology, which hemisphere is removed and the age at which the surgery occurs.

In terms of postoperative motor function, some patients may have improvement or no change of their weaker extremity, and many can walk independently. Most patients postoperatively have minimal to no behavioral problems, satisfactory language skills, good reading capability, and only a minority of patients have a decline in IQ. Predictors of poor outcome may include seizure recurrence and structural abnormalities in the intact hemisphere.

Ultimately, risks and benefits should be weighed on an individual basis and discussed in detail with the neurosurgeon. Many patients have favorable outcomes. The International League Against Epilepsy (ILAE) reports that "about one-fifth of hemispherectomy patients are gainfully employed and even fewer live independently."

== See also ==
- Corpus callosotomy
- Hemispherectomy Foundation
