= Schneckenbecken dysplasia =

- Other names: Chondrodysplasia lethal neonatal with snail like pelvis
- This condition is inherited following an autosomal recessive manner.
- Specialty: Medical genetics
- Symptoms: Short-limbed dwarfism and prenatal death associated with various other radiological anomalies
- Complications: Prenatal death
- Usual onset: Birth
- Duration: Pregnancy
- Causes: Genetic mutation
- Diagnostic method: Genetic testing, ultrasound, autopsy
- Prevention: none
- Prognosis: Poor
- Frequency: rare, about 20 cases have been described
- Deaths: all cases of Schneckenbecken dysplasia have been dead fetuses.

Schneckenbecken dysplasia is a rare pre-natally fatal hereditary autosomal recessive condition which affects the bones and pre-natal growth.

== Signs and symptoms ==
Fetuses with the condition typically have a hypoplastic iliac bone which resembles a snail, short ribs, short neck, shortened and widened (dysplastic) fibula bones, premature ossification of the tarsus, shortened and broadened long bones which resemble a dumbbell, hypoplastic and flattening vertebrae, macrocephaly, dolichocephaly, toenail hypoplasia, flattening of the malar prominence, and micromelic (short-limbed) dwarfism.

=== Complications ===
Fetuses homozygous for this condition typically die before being born, and because of this they don't usually live to experience the complications of the disease.

== Genetics ==
This condition is typically caused by loss-of-function mutations in the SLC35D1 gene, located in chromosome 1. These mutations are inherited in an autosomal recessive manner.

== Diagnosis ==
This condition can be diagnosed through the following methods:

- Ultrasound (due to its prenatally fatal nature)
- Whole genome sequencing
- Physical examination
- Post-mortem autopsy

== Treatment ==
There is no cure for this disorder, and attempted treatment will always be ineffective due to this condition's lethal nature.

== Prevalence ==
According to OrphaNet, less than 20 cases have been reported.

== History ==
This condition was first discovered in 1986 by Knowles et al. when they described 5 fetuses born to a consanguineous, first-cousin Asian couple. The couple in question went through 13 pregnancies, these pregnancies consisted of 4 successful pregnancies which resulted in healthy children, 5 pregnancies which resulted in dead dwarf babies, 3 pregnancies which ended in miscarriage, and 1 pregnancy which was clinically aborted after the pre-natal detection of dwarfism.

== Eponym ==
This condition is named after the German translation for "snail-pelvis" (Schneckenbecken), this name was first used by Borochowitz et al. when they described a Californian fetus with the symptoms of the disorder and referred to said symptoms as "Schneckenbecken dysplasia".

== Mouse knockout model ==
In 2007, Hiraoka et al. created an SLC35D1-knockout mouse model, said experiment revealed that while mice heterozygous for the genetic mutation were born normally without any associated complications, mice homozygous for said mutation died during their neo-natal life. The latter mice had micromelia, craniofacial bone hypoplasia, vertebrae flattening, severely short long bones and iliac bones, Hiraoka noted these symptoms to be similar to those experienced by human fetuses with Schenckenbecken dysplasia, and concluded that this gene must be important for normal ante-natal skeletal formation in mice.

== See also ==
- Achondroplasia
