= Macrocephaly =

Abnormally large head size

- Specialty: Medical genetics

Macrocephaly is a condition in which circumference of the human head is abnormally large. It may be pathological or harmless, and can be a familial genetic characteristic. People diagnosed with macrocephaly will receive further medical tests to determine whether the syndrome is accompanied by particular disorders. Those with benign or familial macrocephaly are considered to have megalencephaly.

== Causes ==
Many people with abnormally large heads or large skulls are healthy, but macrocephaly may be pathological. Pathologic macrocephaly may be due to megalencephaly (enlarged brain), hydrocephalus (abnormally increased cerebrospinal fluid), cranial hyperostosis (bone overgrowth), and other conditions. Pathologic macrocephaly is called "syndromic", when it is associated with any other noteworthy condition, and "nonsyndromic" otherwise. Pathologic macrocephaly may be caused by congenital anatomic abnormalities, genetic conditions, or by environmental events.

Many genetic conditions are associated with macrocephaly, including familial macrocephaly related to the holgate gene, autism, PTEN mutations such as Cowden disease, neurofibromatosis type 1, and tuberous sclerosis; overgrowth syndromes such as Sotos syndrome (cerebral gigantism), Weaver syndrome, Simpson–Golabi–Behmel syndrome (bulldog syndrome), and macrocephaly-capillary malformation (M-CMTC) syndrome; neurocardiofacial-cutaneous syndromes such as Noonan syndrome, Costello syndrome, Gorlin syndrome, (also known as basal cell nevus syndrome) and cardiofaciocutaneous syndrome; Fragile X syndrome; leukodystrophies (brain white matter degeneration) such as Alexander disease, Canavan disease, and megalencephalic leukoencephalopathy with subcortical cysts; and glutaric aciduria type 1 and D-2-hydroxyglutaric aciduria.

At one end of the genetic spectrum, duplications of chromosomes have been found to be related to autism and macrocephaly; at the other end, deletions of chromosomes have been found to be related to schizophrenia and microcephaly.

Environmental events associated with macrocephaly include infection, neonatal intraventricular hemorrhage (bleeding within the infant brain), subdural hematoma (bleeding beneath the outer lining of the brain), subdural effusion (collection of fluid beneath the outer lining of the brain), and arachnoid cysts (cysts on the brain surface).

In research, cranial height or brain imaging may be used to determine intracranial volume more accurately.

Below is a list of conditions featuring macrocephaly from NCBI's MedGen:

- Achondroplasia
- Acrocallosal syndrome
- Adams–Oliver syndrome
- Adenosine kinase deficiency
- Antley–Bixler syndrome
- Autosomal dominant Kenny–Caffey syndrome
- Autosomal recessive osteopetrosis
- Axenfeld–Rieger syndrome
- B4GALT1-congenital disorder of glycosylation
- Bardet–Biedl syndrome
- Brittle cornea syndrome
- Camptomelic dysplasia
- Cardiofaciocutaneous syndrome
- Cobblestone lissencephaly without muscular or ocular involvement
- Coffin–Siris syndrome
- Cohen–Gibson syndrome
- Cole–Carpenter syndrome
- Congenital disorder of glycosylation, type Iw, autosomal dominant
- Corpus callosum, agenesis of
- Costello syndrome
- Cowden syndrome
- Craniodiaphyseal dysplasia, autosomal dominant
- Cranioectodermal dysplasia
- Craniometaphyseal dysplasia
- Craniosynostosis
- D-2-hydroxyglutaric aciduria
- Deficiency of alpha-mannosidase
- Desmosterolosis
- Donnai–Barrow syndrome
- Early-onset parkinsonism-intellectual disability syndrome
- Ehlers–Danlos syndrome, spondylodysplastic type
- Epidermolysis bullosa simplex
- Fragile X syndrome
- Giant axonal neuropathy
- Glutaric aciduria, type 1
- Gorlin syndrome
- Greenberg dysplasia
- Greig cephalopolysyndactyly syndrome
- Hamartoma of hypothalamus
- Holoprosencephaly
- Hurler syndrome

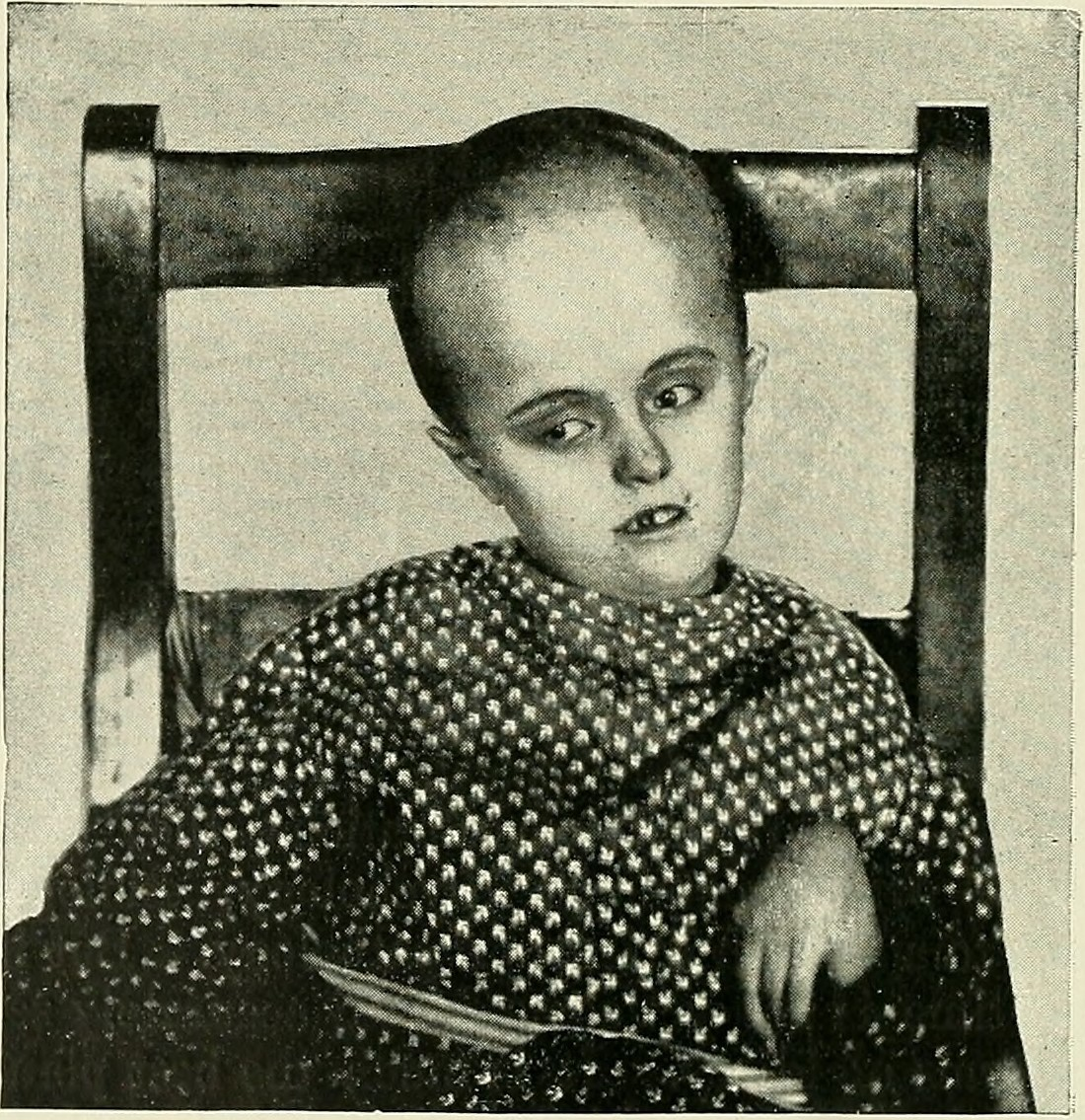
Macrocephaly from hydrocephalus

- Hydrocephalus, nonsyndromic, autosomal recessive
- Hypochondroplasia
- Hypophosphatemic rickets and hyperparathyroidism
- Hypothyroidism, congenital, nongoitrous
- Ito hypomelanosis
- Joubert syndrome
- Keipert syndrome
- Legius syndrome
- LEOPARD syndrome
- Lethal congenital contracture syndrome
- MASA syndrome

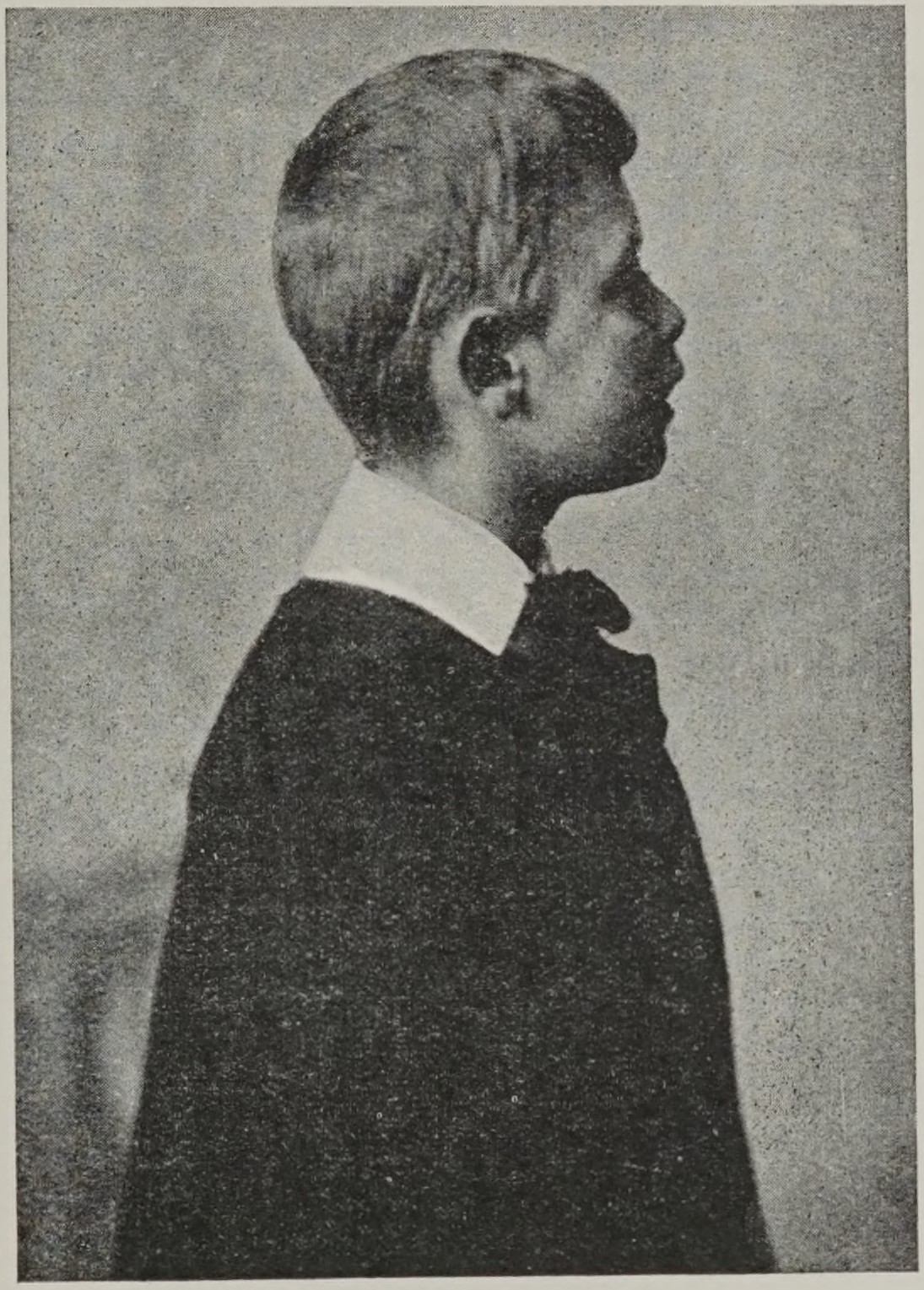
Macrocephaly from megalencephaly

- Megalencephaly, autosomal dominant
- Megalocornea-intellectual disability syndrome
- MGAT2-congenital disorder of glycosylation
- MOMO syndrome
- Mucopolysaccharidosis type 6
- Mucopolysaccharidosis type 7
- Mucopolysaccharidosis, MPS-II
- Mucopolysaccharidosis, MPS-III-D
- Muenke syndrome
- Multiple acyl-CoA dehydrogenase deficiency
- Multiple congenital anomalies-hypotonia-seizures syndrome
- Multiple epiphyseal dysplasia, Al-Gazali type
- Myhre syndrome
- Neurofibromatosis, type 1
- Neurofibromatosis-Noonan syndrome
- Niemann–Pick disease, type A
- Noonan syndrome
- Opsismodysplasia
- Optic atrophy
- Osteopathia striata with cranial sclerosis
- Pallister–Killian syndrome
- Parietal foramina
- Parietal foramina with cleidocranial dysplasia
- Pelger-Huët anomaly
- Peroxisome biogenesis disorder 1A (Zellweger)
- Peroxisome biogenesis disorder 4B
- Phelan–McDermid syndrome
- Plasminogen deficiency, type I
- Primrose syndrome
- Proteus syndrome
- Ritscher-Schinzel syndrome
- Robinow syndrome
- Sandhoff disease
- Schneckenbecken dysplasia
- Sclerosteosis
- Severe X-linked myotubular myopathy
- Sialuria
- Simpson–Golabi–Behmel syndrome
- Snijders Blok–Campeau syndrome
- Sotos syndrome
- Sturge–Weber syndrome
- Sulfite oxidase deficiency due to molybdenum cofactor deficiency
- Symphalangism with multiple anomalies of hands and feet
- Syndromic X-linked intellectual disability
- Thanatophoric dysplasia type 1
- Vanishing white matter disease
- Weaver syndrome
- X-linked dominant chondrodysplasia, Chassaing-Lacombe type
- X-linked hydrocephalus syndrome
- X-linked intellectual disability with marfanoid habitus
- Zimmermann–Laband syndrome
- ZTTK syndrome

== Diagnosis ==
Macrocephaly is customarily diagnosed if head circumference is greater than two standard deviations (SDs) above the mean. Relative macrocephaly occurs if the measure is less than two SDs above the mean, but is disproportionately above that when ethnicity and stature are considered. Diagnosis can be determined in utero or can be determined within 18–24 months after birth in some cases where head circumference tends to stabilize in infants. Diagnosis in infants includes measuring the circumference of the child's head and comparing how significant it falls above the 97.5 percentile of children similar to their demographic. If falling above the 97.5th percentile then the patient will be checked to determine whether there is any intracranial pressure present and whether or not immediate surgery is needed. If immediate surgery is not needed then further testing will be done to determine whether the patient has either macrocephaly or benign macrocephaly.

Diagnosis for macrocephaly involves the comparison of the infant's head circumference to that of other infants of the same age and ethnicity. If a patient is suspected of having macrocephaly molecular testing will be used to confirm diagnosis. Symptoms vary depending on the cause of macrocephaly in the child and if the child has any other accompanying syndromes which will be determined through molecular testing.

=== Benign or familial macrocephaly ===
Benign macrocephaly can occur without reason or be inherited by one or both parents (in which it is considered benign familial macrocephaly and is considered a megalencephaly form of macrocephaly). Diagnosis for familial macrocephaly is determined by measuring the head circumference of both parents and comparing it to the child's. Benign and familial macrocephaly is not associated with neurological disorders. While benign and familial macrocephaly do not result in neurological disorders, neurodevelopment will still need to be assessed.

Although neurological disorders do not occur, temporary symptoms of benign and familial macrocephaly include: developmental delay, epilepsy, and mild hypotonia.

Neurodevelopment is assessed for all cases and suspected cases of macrocephaly to determine whether and what treatments may be needed, and whether any other syndrome/s may be present or likely to develop.

=== Other forms ===
Other forms of macrocephaly include:

- Macrocephaly at birth: congenital macrocephaly already present at birth.
- Postnatal macrocephaly: macrocephaly developed postnatally (after birth).
- Progressive macrocephaly: macrocephaly developed progressively over time.
- Relative macrocephaly: mild macrocephaly measured under 2 SD from mean, but larger in appearance due to other factors (ex. short stature).

== Treatment ==
Treatment varies depending on whether or not it occurs with other medical conditions in the child and where the cerebrospinal fluid is present. If benign and found between the brain and skull then no surgery is needed. If excess fluid is found between the ventricle spaces in the brain then surgery will be needed.

== Associated syndromes ==
Below is a list of syndromes associated with macrocephaly that are noted in Signs and Symptoms of Genetic Conditions: A Handbook.

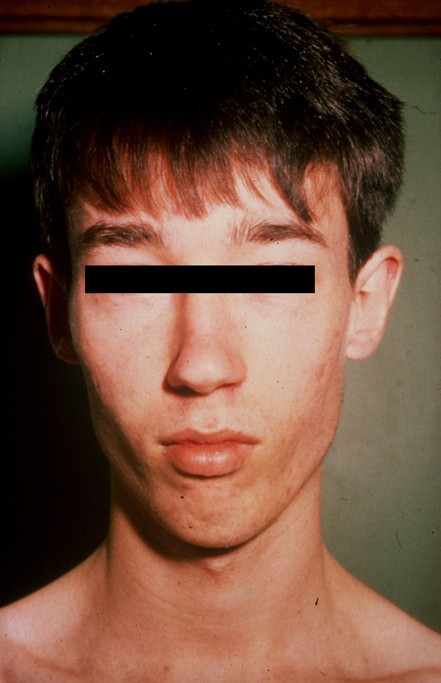
Lujan–Fryns syndrome

=== Include multiple major and or minor anomalies ===
- Acrocallosal syndrome
- Apert syndrome
- Bannayan–Riley–Ruvalcaba syndrome
- Cardiofaciocutaneous syndrome
- Chromosome 14 - maternal disomy
- Chromosome 22qter deletion
- Cleidocranial dysostosis
- Costello syndrome
- Encephalocraniocutaneous lipomatosis
- FG syndrome
- Hallermann–Streiff syndrome
- Hydrolethalus syndrome
- Hypomelanosis syndrome
- Hypomelanosis of Ito
- Kelvin Peter anomaly plus syndrome
- Lujan–Fryns syndrome
- Macrocephaly-CM (MCAP)
- Marshall–Smith syndrome
- Neuhauser megalocornea/MR syndrome
- Neurofibromatosis type I
- Nevoid basal-cell carcinoma syndrome
- Noonan syndrome
- Ocular-ectodermal syndrome
- Osteopathia striata - cranial sclerosis
- Perlman syndrome
- Robinow syndrome
- Simpson–Golabi–Behmel syndrome
- Sotos syndrome
- Sturge–Weber syndrome
- Weaver syndrome
- Wiedemann–Rautenstrauch syndrome
- 3C syndrome

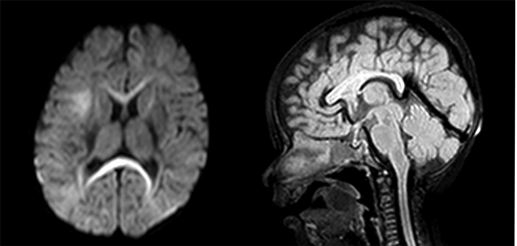
Sturge–Weber syndrome

=== Secondary to a metabolic disorder ===
- Glutaric aciduria type II
- GM1 gangliosidosis
- Hunter syndrome
- Hurler syndrome
- MPS VII
- Sanfilippo syndrome
- Zellweger syndrome

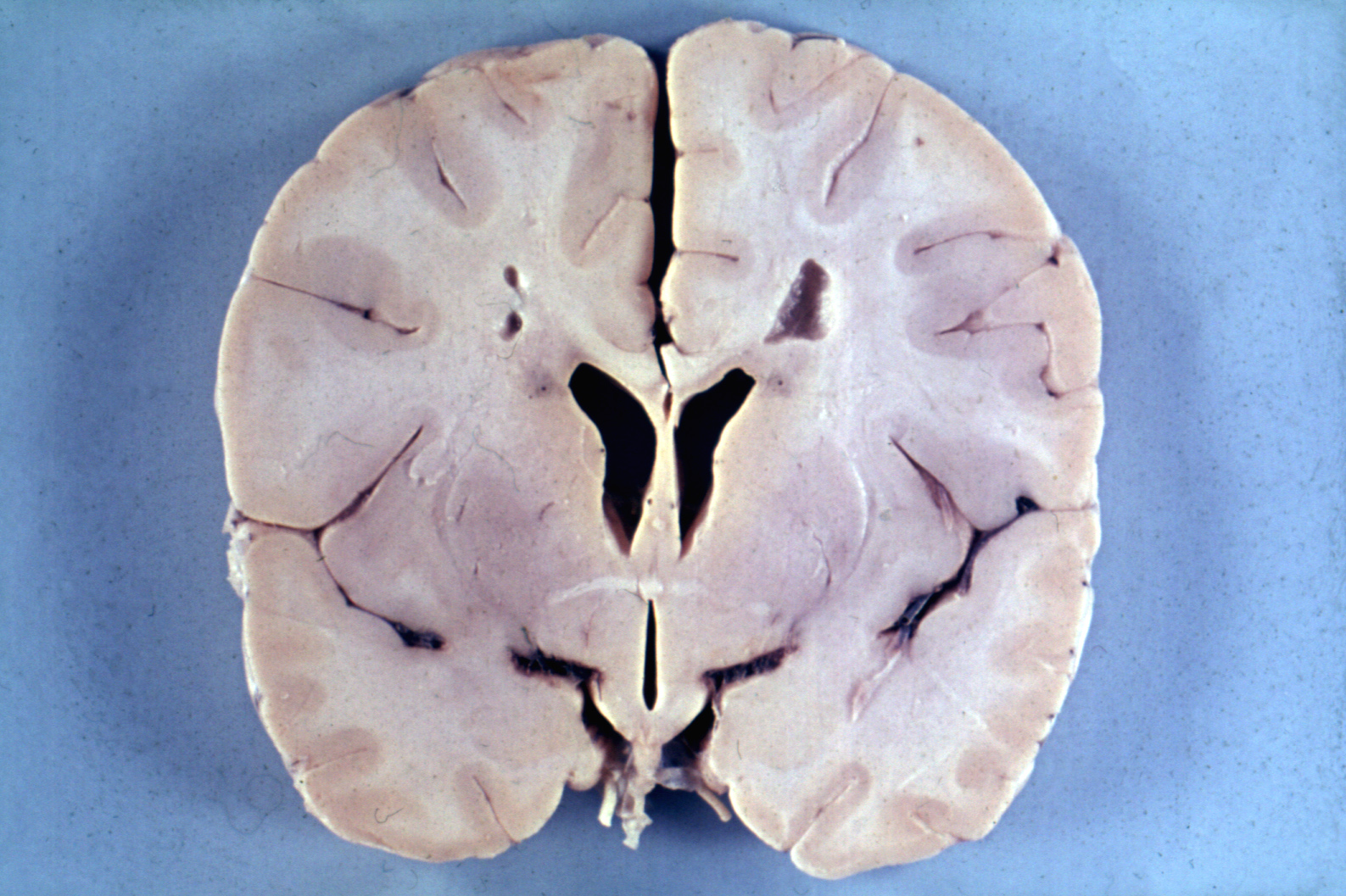
Alexander disease

=== Associated with a skeletal dysplasia ===
- Achondroplasia
- Campomelic dysplasia
- Craniodiaphyseal dysplasia
- Craniometaphyseal dysplasia
- Hypochondrogenesis
- Hypochondroplasia
- Kenny–Caffey syndrome
- Kniest dysplasia
- Lenz–Majewski syndrome
- Osteogenesis imperfecta III
- Osteopetrosis, autosomal recessive form
- Schneckenbecken dysplasia
- Sclerosteosis
- Short rib syndrome, beemer-langer type
- Short rib-polydactyly 2 (majewski type)
- Spondyloepiphyseal dysplasia congenita
- Thanatophoric dysplasia

Tay–Sachs disease

=== With no obvious physical findings ===
- Alexander disease
- Canavan disease
- Cobalamin deficiency (combined methylmalonic aciduria and homocystinuria)
- Dandy–Walker malformation
- Glutaric aciduria type 1
- L-2-hydroxyglutaric aciduria
- Megalencephalic leukoencephalopathy with subcortical cysts
- Osteogenesis imperfecta IV
- Osteopathia striata-cranial sclerosis
- Periventricular heterotopia
- Sandhoff disease
- Tay–Sachs disease

== See also ==
- Microcephaly
- Megalencephaly
- Hydrocephalus
- Skull bossing
