= Hemimegalencephaly =

Disorder affecting development of one side of the brain

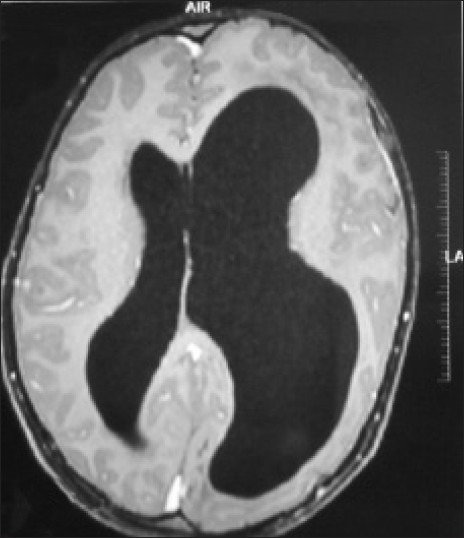
- Left-sided hemimegalencephaly in a person with neurofibromatosis
- Specialty: Neurology, rheumatology
- Symptoms: Frequent seizures often resistant to medicine
- Usual onset: Congenital
- Duration: Long term
- Treatment: Hemispherectomy
- Medication: Anti-epileptic drugs

Hemimegalencephaly (HME), or unilateral megalencephaly, is a rare congenital disorder affecting all or a part of a cerebral hemisphere. It causes severe seizures, which are often frequent and hard to control. A minority might have seizure control with medicines, but most will need removal or disconnection of the affected hemisphere as the best chance. Uncontrolled, they often cause progressive intellectual disability & brain damage, and stop development.

== Symptoms and signs ==
Seizures are the main symptom. There can be as many as hundreds of seizures a day. Seizures tend to begin soon after birth, but may sometimes commence during later infancy or, rarely, during early childhood.

=== Other symptoms ===
- Asymmetrical or enlarged head
- Developmental delay
- Progressive weakness of half the body
- Progressive blindness of half the body

== Genetics ==
Somatic activation of AKT3 causes hemispheric developmental brain malformations.

== Pathophysiology ==
It is a disorder related to excessive neuronal proliferation and hamartomatous overgrowth affecting the cortical formation. The excessive proliferation is postulated to occur early and to possibly continue beyond the normal proliferative period. Epidermal growth factor is thought to play an important role in the excessive proliferation and the pathogenesis of HME.

== Diagnosis ==
It should be suspected in infants or children with intractable, frequent seizures. On a CT scan, the affected part is distorted and enlarged. It can be diagnosed prenatally, but a lot of cases go undiagnosed until seizures begin. Ultrasound can display asymmetrical brain hemispheres.

== Treatment ==
Although there have been a few reports of medical treatment, the main treatment is radical: remove or disconnect the affected side. However, it has a high mortality [recent citations needed], and there have been reports of a vegetative state and seizures resuming, this time in the healthy hemisphere.

Surgery is usually performed as soon as possible to minimize damage caused by seizures. However, a trial with drugs can be attempted for a few months before surgery, and there is a slim chance of it succeeding. Because brain plasticity decreases with age, the earlier in life the surgery is completed, the more likely it is that the remaining hemisphere will adapt to perform tasks previously completed by the missing hemisphere.

Benzodiazepines might control the seizures.
