= PPP2R5D =

Protein-coding gene in humans

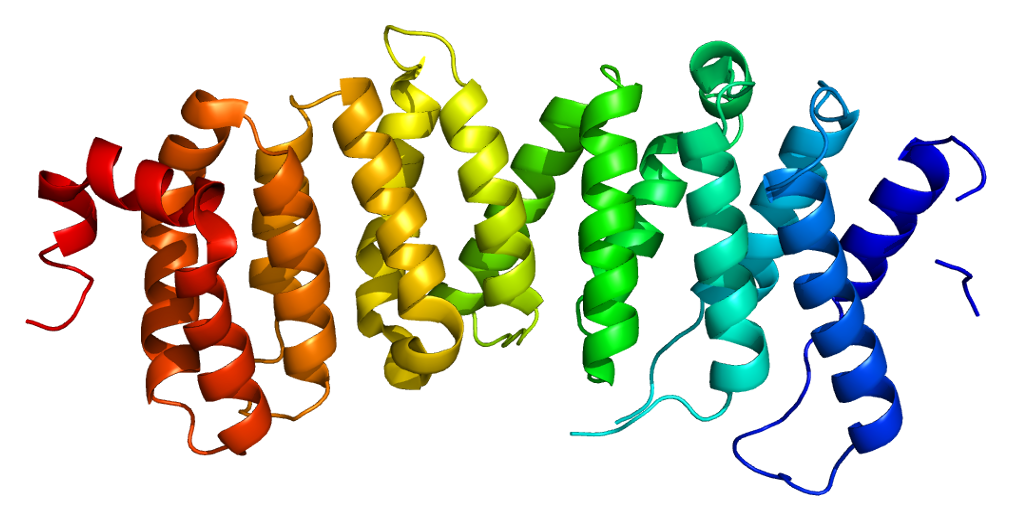

Identifiers
- Aliases: PPP2R5D, B56D, MRD35, protein phosphatase 2 regulatory subunit B'delta, B56delta
- External IDs: OMIM: 601646; MGI: 2388481; GeneCards: PPP2R5D

Gene location (Human)
Chr.	Chromosome 6 (human)
Band	6p21.1	Start	42,984,553 bp
Band	6p21.1	End	43,012,342 bp

Gene location (Mouse)
Chr.	Chromosome 17 (mouse)
Band	17 22.9 cM|17 C	Start	46,993,917 bp
Band	17 22.9 cM|17 C	End	47,016,037 bp
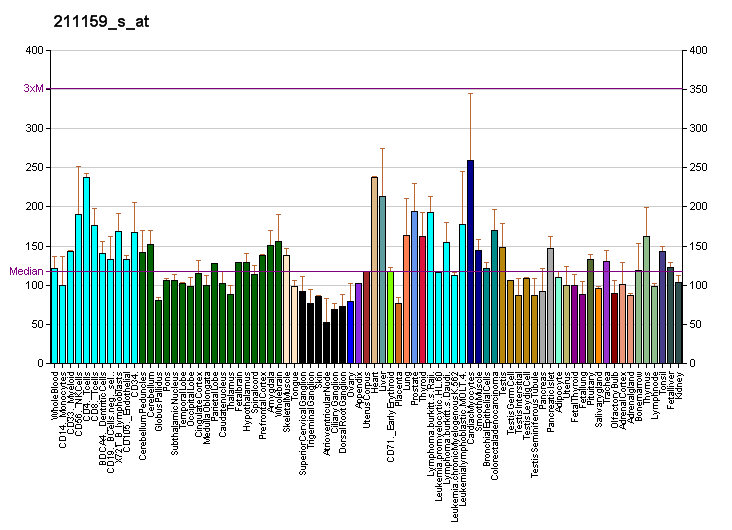

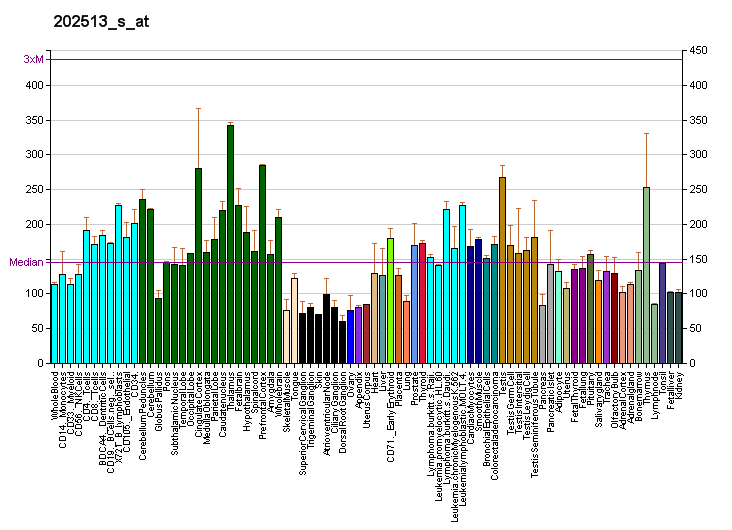
RNA expression pattern
Bgee	Human / Mouse (ortholog); Top expressed in: ganglionic eminence; ventricular zone; prefrontal cortex; smooth muscle tissue; right hemisphere of cerebellum; stromal cell of endometrium; right frontal lobe; pancreatic ductal cell; gastrocnemius muscle; muscle of thigh / Top expressed in: tail of embryo; yolk sac; genital tubercle; ventricular zone; dentate gyrus of hippocampal formation granule cell; superior frontal gyrus; epiblast; neural layer of retina; maxillary prominence; medial dorsal nucleus; More reference expression data
BioGPS	More reference expression data
Gene ontology
Molecular function	protein serine/threonine phosphatase activity; protein binding; protein phosphatase regulator activity; phosphoprotein phosphatase activity; protein phosphatase activator activity
Cellular component	cytoplasm; cytosol; protein phosphatase type 2A complex; nucleoplasm; nucleus
Biological process	nervous system development; signal transduction; positive regulation of protein dephosphorylation; protein dephosphorylation; regulation of phosphoprotein phosphatase activity; negative regulation of peptidyl-threonine phosphorylation; regulation of protein autophosphorylation
Sources:Amigo / QuickGO
Orthologs
Databases	NCBI: entry; OMA: entry
Species	Human	Mouse
Entrez	5528	21770
Ensembl	ENSG00000112640	ENSMUSG00000059409
UniProt	Q14738	n/a
RefSeq (mRNA)	NM_180977; NM_001270476; NM_006245; NM_180976	NM_009358; NM_001357684
RefSeq (protein)	NP_001257405; NP_006236; NP_851307; NP_851308	n/a
Location (UCSC)	Chr 6: 42.98 – 43.01 Mb	Chr 17: 46.99 – 47.02 Mb
PubMed search
- Wikidata
View/Edit Human	View/Edit Mouse

Serine/threonine-protein phosphatase 2A 56 kDa regulatory subunit delta isoform is an enzyme that in humans is encoded by the PPP2R5D gene. Mutations in PPP2R5D cause Jordan's syndrome.

== Function ==
The product of this gene belongs to the phosphatase 2A regulatory subunit B family. Protein phosphatase 2A is one of the four major Ser/Thr phosphatases, and it is implicated in the negative control of cell growth and division. It consists of a common heteromeric core enzyme, which is composed of a catalytic subunit and a constant regulatory subunit, that associates with a variety of regulatory subunits. The B regulatory subunit might modulate substrate selectivity and catalytic activity. This gene encodes a delta isoform of the regulatory subunit B56 subfamily. Alternatively spliced transcript variants encoding different isoforms have been identified.

== Interactions ==
PPP2R5D has been shown to interact with:

- HAND2,
- PPP2CA,
- PPP2R1B, and
- liprin-alpha-1.
