= Stem Cells (journal) =

- Discipline: Cell biology
- Language: English
- Edited by: Jan Nolta

Publication details
- Former name(s): The International Journal of Cell Cloning
- History: 1983-present
- Publisher: AlphaMed Press; John Wiley & Sons
- Frequency: Monthly
- Impact factor: 6.277 (2020)

Standard abbreviations
- ISO 4: Stem Cells

Indexing
- CODEN: STCEEJ
- ISSN: 1066-5099 (print); 1549-4918 (web)
- OCLC no.: 26971021

Links
- Journal homepage

Stem Cells is a peer-review scientific journal of cell biology. It was established as The International Journal of Cell Cloning in 1983, acquiring its current title in 1993.

The journal is published by AlphaMed Press, and is currently edited by Jan Nolta (University of California). Stem Cells currently has an impact factor of 6.277.

== Abstracting and indexing ==
The journal is abstracted and indexed in the following bibliographic databases:

- Academic OneFile
- Biological Abstracts
- Biological Sciences
- BIOSIS Previews
- Biotechnology & Bioengineering Abstracts
- Biotechnology Research Abstracts
- Calcium & Calcified Tissue Abstracts
- Chemical Abstracts Service
- Chemoreception Abstracts
- CSA Engineering Research Database
- CSA Nucleic Acids Abstracts
- CSA Technology Research Database
- Current Contents/Life Sciences
- Embase
- Genetics Abstracts
- Health Reference Center Academic
- Health Economic Evaluations Database
- InfoTrac
- Materials Science & Engineering Database
- MEDLINE/PubMed
- Neurosciences Abstracts
- ProQuest Biological Science Collection
- ProQuest Central
- ProQuest Health & Medical Complete
- ProQuest Natural Science Collection
- ProQuest SciTech Collection
- ProQuest Technology Collection
- Science Citation Index
- SCOPUS
- VINITI
- Web of Science
