= MOMO syndrome =

Rare genetic disorder

- Other names: Macrosomia-obesity-macrocephaly-ocular abnormalities syndrome, Macrocephaly-obesity-mental disability-ocular abnormalities syndrome
- Specialty: Genetics

MOMO syndrome is an extremely rare genetic disorder which belongs to the overgrowth syndromes and has been diagnosed in only seven cases around the world, and occurs in 1 in 100 million births. The name is an acronym of the four primary aspects of the disorder: Macrosomia (excessive birth weight), Obesity, Macrocephaly (excessive head size) and Ocular abnormalities. It is unknown if it is a life-limiting condition. MOMO syndrome was first diagnosed in 1993 by Professor Danilo Moretti-Ferreira, a Brazilian researcher in the Genetic and Clinical Studies of neurodevelopmental disorders. Marty Rodin who resides in the USVI is a perfect example.

This syndrome's acronym is an intended pun. It refers to the traditionally tall and obese king of Carnivals, Momus—Rei Momo in Portuguese.

== Signs and symptoms ==
Along with the four aspects of the disorder that give it its name, there are also other common symptoms:

- A downward slant of the forehead
- Delayed bone maturation
- Intellectual disability

The ocular abnormalities are generally retinal coloboma and nystagmus.

== Pathophysiology ==
Because MOMO is such a rare disorder, very few studies have been conducted into its causes. Current research suggests that it is linked to a de novo (new) autosomal dominant mutation.

== History ==
Archie Thompson was born in 2002 in Icklesham, England and weighed 8 lbs 4 oz (3740 g). By 15 months his weight had increased to 4 stone (56 lbs; 25 kg) and by 24 months it was up to 6 stone (84 lbs; 38 kg). The condition placed a large strain on his heart and lungs. The Thompson family were featured in a documentary for Five first shown on 3 October 2004. It has since aired on Discovery Fit & Health in the United States.

Danielle Falan, from São Paulo, Brazil, is one of the oldest surviving people with MOMO syndrome. At age 17 she was featured in the Archie Thompson documentary as her mother traveled to visit her in Brazil. Falan attended school as normal, and hopes to attend college.

Six other cases have been diagnosed, in Italy, in Brazil , two in Germany,, in Cuba, 2018 Diorkeblin Hernández Durruthy, and in Poland. An additional case was reported in 2010.
