= Rasmussen syndrome =

Rare neurological inflammatory disease

Rasmussen syndrome, also known as Rasmussen's encephalitis, is a rare progressive autoimmune neurological disease. It is characterized by frequent and severe focal seizures, progressive neurological decline, hemiparesis (weakness on one side of the body), encephalitis, and unilateral cerebral atrophy. The disease primarily affects children under the age of 15, though adult cases have been reported. It was originally described as a form of chronic focal motor epilepsy by Dr. A. Ya. Kozhevnikov in the 1880s and separately identified as focal seizures due to chronic localized encephalitis in the 1950s by Dr. Theodore Rasmussen. It is now classified to be a cytotoxic T-cell–mediated encephalitis.

== Signs and symptoms ==
The hallmark symptoms are focal seizures, particularly epilepsia partialis continua (EPC), a form of epilepsy characterized by continuous or near-continuous clonic movements in a localized body part. These seizures are typically resistant to standard anti-epileptic medications and often mark the early stage of the disease.

This is often seen in the first main stage, sometimes preceded by a 'prodromal stage' of a few months. In the acute stage, which may last between four to eight months, the inflammation is active and symptoms worsen progressively. Children may initially present with subtle behavioral or academic changes before the onset of the drug-resistant focal seizures present. Over time as the disease advances, patients develop hemiparesis, hemianopia (vision loss of one side of visual field), and cognitive deficits, involving learning, memory or language. In this phase, an MRI often reveals hemispheric swelling and beginning signs of atrophy.

The chronic or residual stage occurs after inflammation subsides. While the active immune damage lessens, the neurological deficits persist due to structural brain damage. Patients are often left with long-term epilepsy, paralysis/motor impairment, and cognitive dysfunction, although the severity varies. Early diagnosis and treatment may lessen the long term disability in some cases.

Rasmussen's Encephalitis is most commonly diagnosed in children, with an average age of 6 years. However, approximately 10% of reported cases begin in adulthood.

== Pathophysiology ==
Rasmussen's encephalitis is theorized as a T-cell-mediated autoimmune encephalitis, characterized by chronic, progressive inflammation limited to a single hemisphere of the brain. Histological analysis of affected brain tissues reveals infiltration of cytotoxic CD8+ T lymphocytes, which target neurons and astrocytes. These immune cells release granzyme B and perforin, an enzyme and protein that kill cells. This leads to direct neuronal apoptosis. The presence of activated microglia, identified through HLA-DR and CD68 immunostaining in brain biopsy samples, reflects a broader neuroinflammatory response that contributes to gliosis and progressive neuronal degeneration. This immune-mediated damage results in cortical atrophy, which is most pronounced in frontal and insular lobes, along with spreading posteriorly with disease progression.

While the exact trigger for this immune response remain unclear, several autoimmune hypotheses have been proposed. Early researchers suggested a role for antibodies against GluR3, a subunit of AMPA-type glutamate receptors but these findings have not been consistently replicated. Recent research has identified auto antibodies against the anti-NDMA receptor subunit GluRepsilon2 (NR2A), these are not consistently present across cases and may represent a secondary epiphenomenon rather than a primary pathogenic mechanism. There is limited evidence for auto antibodies targeting the nicotinic acetylcholine receptor.

Emerging immunological studies have shown that patients display persistent peripheral expansion of clonally restricted CD8+ T cells, which are theorized to cross the blood brain barrier and sustain cortical inflammation for years. Suggesting an antigen-drive, chronic immune response that initiates in the periphery and targets CNS antigen. The epilepsy observed in Rasmussen's encephalitis is a potential amplifier of immune-mediated damage, through mechanisms involving excitotoxicity and impaired GABAergic inhibition.

Rare associations with systemic autoimmune disorders, such as neurovisceral porphyria and acute intermittent porphyria, have been reported in isolated cases.

== Diagnosis ==
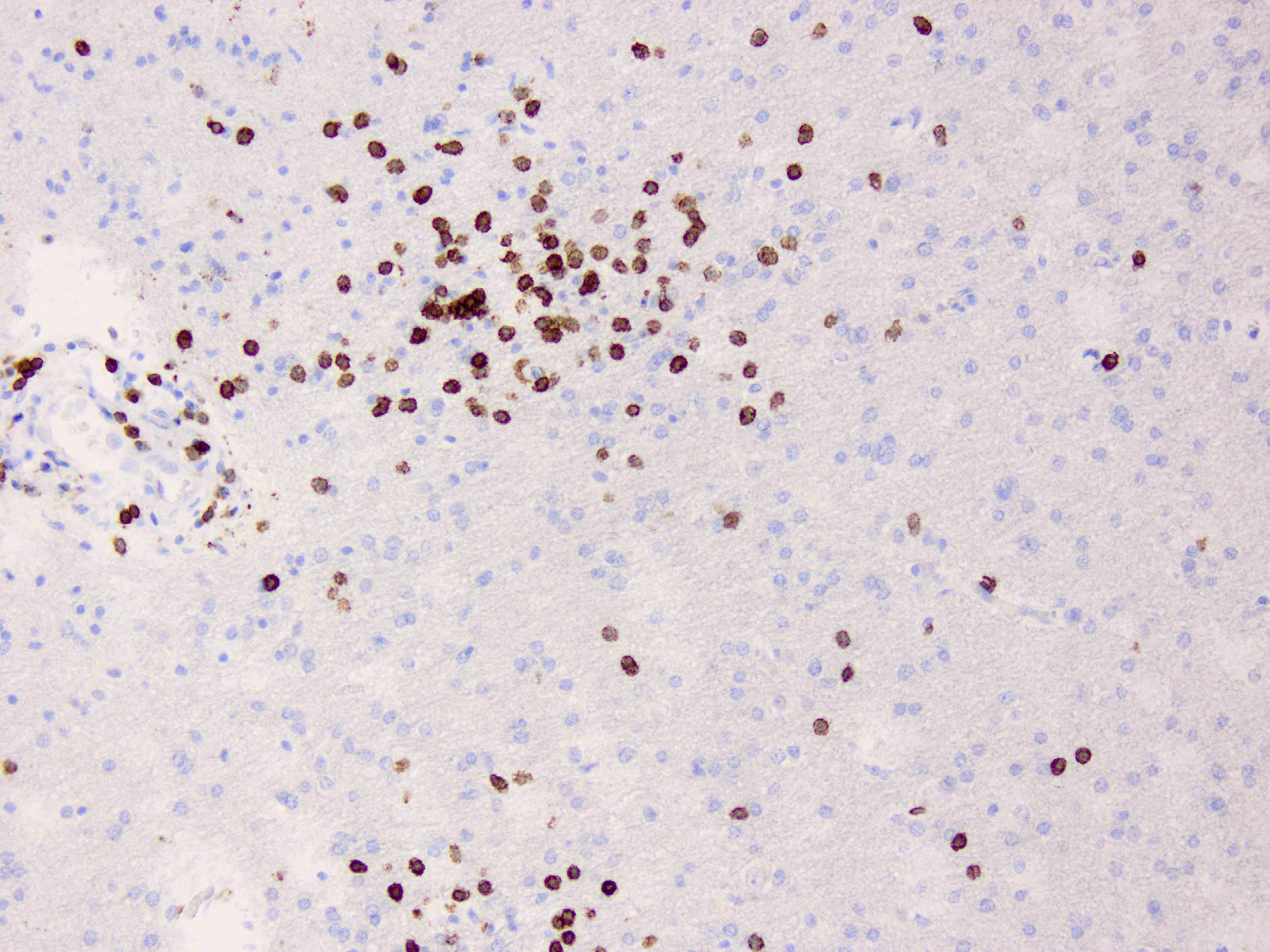
Brain biopsy in Rasmussen's encephalitis showing lymphocytic infiltrates staining for CD8 on immunohistochemistry

Early multidisciplinary diagnostic approach is essential as delayed diagnosis may lead to irreversible neurological decline.

Diagnosis of Rasmussen's encephalitis is made through combination of clinical evaluation, electrophysiological findings, and neuroimaging, with invasive procedures deemed unnecessary.

Electroencephalography (EEG) is a crucial diagnostic tool, revealing focal epileptiform discharge and slowing of background activity in affected hemisphere. Over time, these abnormalities often display more lateralized and severe form of epilepsy.

Magnetic resonance imaging (MRI) showcase the progressive hemispheric atrophy, often beginning in the frontal or insular regions, then expanding posteriorly. In early phases, brain scans reveal cortical swelling and T2/FLAIR hyperintensites consistent with inflammation. In later stages, this evolves into clear volume loss, ventricular enlargement, and gliosis.

Brain biopsy is not always required. It can provide definitive histopathology confirmation, especially atypical presentations or when alternative diagnoses (tumors or other forms of encephalitis) are being considered. When retrieved the tissue analysis can also help rule out infections, neoplastic, or demyelinating processes.

== Treatment ==
Treatment is typically divided into two phases: management of active inflammation in acute stage and control long-term neurological symptoms in the residual stage.

During the acute stage, the primary goal is to suppress the autoimmune response and slow neurological decline. The first treatment usually include high dose corticosteroids, either as intravenous methylprednisolone pulses or as oral maintenance therapy. Intravenous immunoglobulin (IVIG) shown benefit in both pediatric and adult cases, often used monthly to modulate immune activity and reduce seizure frequency. Other immunotherapies such as plasmapheresis, azathioprine, cyclophosphamide, mycophenolate mofetil, and tacrolimus have been used at varying success, though clinical trials are still in progress. While these therapies can delay disease progression, they do not consistently prevent long term disability and responses varies between individuals.

In chronic, or residual stage, the inflammatory activity subsides but neurological damage is often irreversible. Treatment shifts toward symptom management, especially seizure control. Standard anti-seizure medications are typically ineffective due to the focal drug resistant nature of the epilepsy. For many patients, functional hemispherectomy (surgical disconnection or removal of the affected hemisphere) becomes the most effective option to stop seizures. Variants such as anatomical hemispherectomy or hemispherotomy may be chosen based on age and severity of deficits.

While hemispherectomy is associated with significant risks, such as permanent hemiplegia, hemianopia, and potential language loss if the dominant hemisphere is removed, it is often used as it results in dramatic seizure reduction or remission for better quality of life. Early surgery in children, especially those under age 10, may offer better functional reorganization and recovery of language and cognitive skills by the contralateral hemisphere.

Due to the severity of the procedure and its implications, some centers prioritizing early surgery and others favoring prolonged immunotherapy before considering invasive intervention.

== History ==
It is named after Dr. Theodore Rasmussen (1910–2002), a pioneering neurosurgeon who succeeded Wilder Penfield as head of the Montreal Neurological Institute, and served as Neurosurgeon-in-Chief at the Royal Victoria Hospital. In the 1950s, Rasmussen and colleagues described a series of children presenting intractable focal seizures, progressive hemiparesis, and unilateral cerebral atrophy. Initially referred to as "focal seizures due to chronic localized encephalitis". His clinical observations and early histopathological analyses, often based on tissue obtained from hemispherectomy procedures, led to recognition of the disorders as distinct clinical and neuropathological entity.

Although Rasmussen brought modern recognition, similar cases had been described decades earlier by Dr. A. Ya. Kozhevnikov, a Russian neurologist in Siberia during the 1880s. Kozhevnikov reported chronic focal motor seizures now recognized as EPC, a defining symptom of Rasmussen's encephalitis, in adult patients. The disorder was referred to in some literature as Kozhevnikov epilepsy, highlighting its motor manifestations. It wasn't until the 1980s that researchers unified these clinical concepts and redefined the condition under the name Rasmussen's syndrome (or encephalitis), recognizing the autoimmune and progressive nature of the disease beyond motor seizures alone.

== Society ==
The Hemispherectomy Foundation was formed in 2008 to assist families with children who have Rasmussen's encephalitis and other conditions that require hemispherectomy.

The RE Children's Project was founded in 2010 to increase awareness of Rasmussen's encephalitis. Its primary purpose is to support scientific research directed toward finding a cure for this disease.
