= Theodore Rasmussen =

Canadian-American neurosurgeon

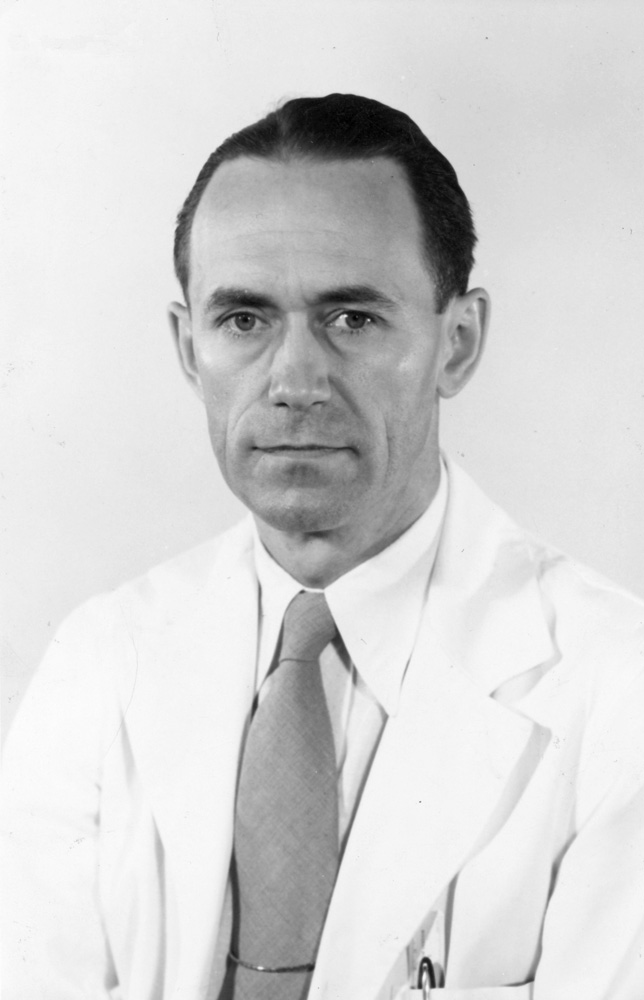
Theodore Brown Rasmussen at the University of Chicago in 1947

Theodore Brown Rasmussen (1910–2002), was a Canadian-American neurosurgeon. He succeeded Wilder Penfield as head of the Montreal Neurological Institute and served as Neurosurgeon-in-Chief at the Royal Victoria Hospital.

Born in Provo, Utah, Rasmussen attended the University of Minnesota for his Medical Degree, graduating in 1935, and his Master of Science degree in neurology which he received in 1939. Afterwards, he pursued a fellowship in Neurology at Mayo Clinic, before finishing his neurosurgical training at the Montreal Neurological Institute under Wilder Penfield. In 1947, Rasmussen move to work at the University of Chicago for 7 years, before returning back to McGill University in Canada in 1954.

Rasmussen was drafted for the Second World War, in 1942, working as the chief of the neurosurgical section of the 14th Evacuation Hospital, being discharged in 1945, as a Lieutenant-colonel.

Rasmussen syndrome is named after him.
