= Synodontis marmoratus =

Conservation status
- Data Deficient (IUCN 3.1)

Scientific classification
- Kingdom: Animalia
- Phylum: Chordata
- Class: Actinopterygii
- Order: Siluriformes
- Family: Mochokidae
- Genus: Synodontis
- Species: S. marmoratus

Binomial name
- Synodontis marmoratus Lönnberg, 1895

Synonyms
- Synodontis marmorata Lönnberg, 1895 (misspelling)

Species of fish

Synodontis marmoratus is a species of upside-down catfish that is native to Cameroon where it is found in the Sanage and Nyong Rivers. It was first described by Swedish zoologist and conservationist Einar Lönnberg in 1895, from a specimen collected from Bonge, Cameroon.

== Description ==
Like all members of the genus Synodontis, S. marmoratus has a strong, bony head capsule that extends back as far as the first spine of the dorsal fin. The head contains a distinct narrow, bony, external protrusion called a humeral process. The shape and size of the humeral process helps to identify the species. In S. marmoratus, the humeral process is more than twice as long as it is wide.

The fish has three pairs of barbels. The maxillary barbels are on located on the upper jaw, and two pairs of mandibular barbels are on the lower jaw. The maxillary barbel is long and straight without any branches, without a membrane at the base. It extends to a length longer than the head, reaching the middle of the humeral process. The mandibular barbels have short and broad branches.

The front edges of the dorsal fins and the pectoral fins of Syntontis species are hardened into stiff spines. In S. marmoratus, the spine of the dorsal fin is short, about half the length of the head, smooth in the front and serrated on the back. The remaining portion of the dorsal fin is made up of seven branching rays. The spine of the pectoral fin about the same size as the dorsal spine, and serrated on both sides. The anal fin contains 11 to 12 branched rays. The tail, or caudal fin, is deeply forked.

All members of Syndontis have a structure called a premaxillary toothpad, which is located on the very front of the upper jaw of the mouth. This structure contains several rows of short, chisel-shaped teeth. On the lower jaw, or mandible, the teeth of Syndontis are attached to flexible, stalk-like structures and described as "s-shaped" or "hooked". The number of teeth on the mandible is used to differentiate between species; in S. marmoratus, there are about 14 to 18 teeth on the mandible.

The base body color is blackish brown, marbled with white. The fins are white, marbled with black.

The maximum standard length of the species is 4 centimetres (1.6 in). Generally, females in the genus Synodontis tend to be slightly larger than males of the same age.

== Habitat and behavior ==
In the wild, the only a few specimens have been collected from a very limited geographic area around Bonge, Cameroon. The reproductive habits of most of the species of Synodontis are not known, beyond some instances of obtaining egg counts from gravid females. Spawning likely occurs during the flooding season between July and October, and pairs swim in unison during spawning. As a whole, species of Synodontis are omnivores, consuming insect larvae, algae, gastropods, bivalves, sponges, crustaceans, and the eggs of other fishes. The growth rate is rapid in the first year, then slows down as the fish age.
