= RAB39B =

Protein-coding gene in the species Homo sapiens

Identifiers
- Aliases: RAB39B, MRX72, WSMN, member RAS oncogene family, BGMR, WSN, XLID72
- External IDs: OMIM: 300774; MGI: 1915040; GeneCards: RAB39B
Enzyme activity
EC #	BRENDA	ExPASy	KEGG	MetaCyc
3.6.5.2	↗	↗	↗	↗

Gene location (Human)
Chr.	X chromosome (human)
Band	Xq28	Start	155,258,235 bp
Band	Xq28	End	155,264,491 bp

Gene location (Mouse)
Chr.	X chromosome (mouse)
Band	X 38.26 cM|X A7.3	Start	74,615,652 bp
Band	X 38.26 cM|X A7.3	End	74,621,837 bp
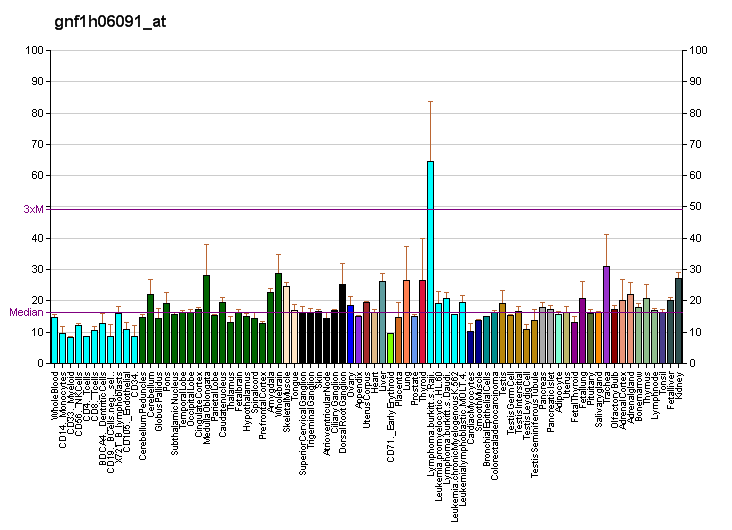
RNA expression pattern
Bgee	Human / Mouse (ortholog); Top expressed in: endothelial cell; Brodmann area 23; middle temporal gyrus; primary visual cortex; islet of Langerhans; Brodmann area 46; prefrontal cortex; dorsolateral prefrontal cortex; Brodmann area 9; superior frontal gyrus / Top expressed in: supraoptic nucleus; superior cervical ganglion; primary motor cortex; facial motor nucleus; ventromedial nucleus; substantia nigra; lateral hypothalamus; piriform cortex; trigeminal ganglion; mammillary body; More reference expression data
BioGPS	More reference expression data
Gene ontology
Molecular function	nucleotide binding; GTP binding; myosin V binding; protein binding; GTPase activity
Cellular component	neuron projection; vesicle; plasma membrane; intracellular anatomical structure; membrane; Golgi apparatus; cytoplasmic vesicle membrane; cytoplasmic vesicle
Biological process	protein transport; synapse organization; vesicle-mediated transport; regulation of autophagy; autophagy; intracellular protein transport; Rab protein signal transduction
Sources:Amigo / QuickGO
Orthologs
Databases	NCBI: entry; OMA: entry
Species	Human	Mouse
Entrez	116442	67790
Ensembl	ENSG00000155961	ENSMUSG00000031202
UniProt	Q96DA2	Q8BHC1
RefSeq (mRNA)	NM_171998	NM_175122
RefSeq (protein)	NP_741995	NP_780331
Location (UCSC)	Chr X: 155.26 – 155.26 Mb	Chr X: 74.62 – 74.62 Mb
PubMed search
- Wikidata
View/Edit Human	View/Edit Mouse

Ras-related protein Rab-39B is a protein that in humans is encoded by the RAB39B gene.

This gene encodes a member of the Rab family of proteins. Rab proteins are small GTPases that are involved in vesicular trafficking.
