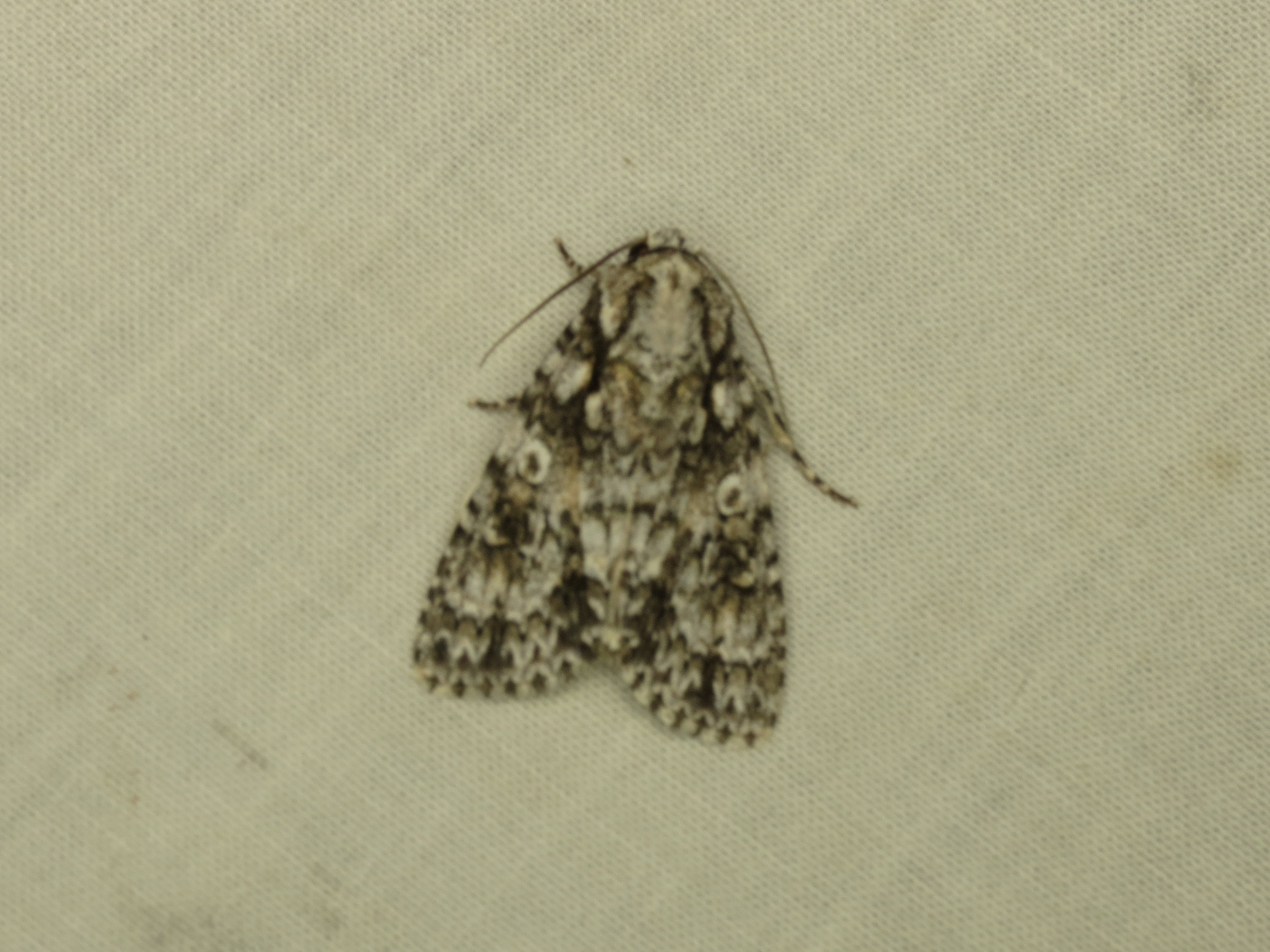

Scientific classification
- Kingdom: Animalia
- Phylum: Arthropoda
- Clade: Pancrustacea
- Class: Insecta
- Order: Lepidoptera
- Superfamily: Noctuoidea
- Family: Noctuidae
- Genus: Acronicta
- Species: A. marmorata

Binomial name
- Acronicta marmorata Smith, 1897

= Acronicta marmorata =

Species of moth

Acronicta marmorata, the marble dagger moth, is a moth of the family Noctuidae. It is widespread in the Pacific West of North America, including British Columbia, Oregon and Washington.

The wingspan is about 43 mm. Adults are on wing from July to August depending on the location.

The larvae feed on oak species, including white oak.
