= Cutis marmorata =

Human skin condition

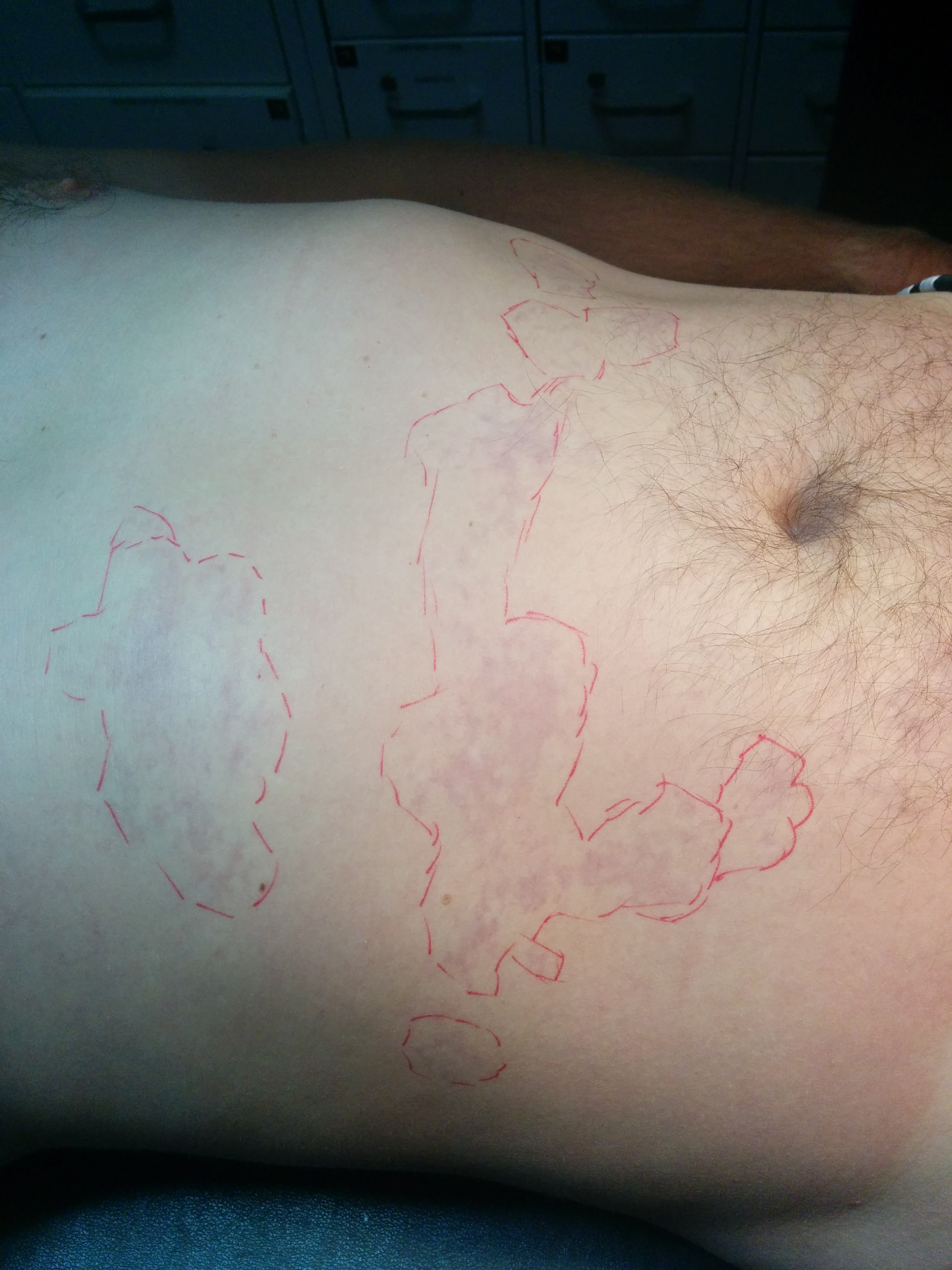
- Cutis marmorata in a patient with Type I decompression sickness (DCS)
- Specialty: Dermatology

Cutis marmorata (from Latin marmor, "marble") is a benign skin condition which, if persistent, occurs in Cornelia de Lange syndrome, trisomy 13 and trisomy 18 syndromes. When a newborn infant is exposed to low environmental temperatures, an evanescent, lacy, reticulated red and/or blue cutaneous vascular pattern appears over most of the body surface. This vascular change represents an accentuated physiologic vasomotor response that disappears with increasing age, although it is sometimes discernible even in older children. It is also seen in cardiogenic shock.

Cutis marmorata telangiectatica congenita is clinically similar, but the lesions are more intense, may be segmental, are persistent, and may be associated with loss of dermal tissue, epidermal atrophy and ulceration.

== In decompression sickness ==
Cutis marmorata also occurs in decompression sickness (DCS). Although it is considered Type I DCS, which is non-neurological, it is typically treated as if the patient has the more severe Type II DCS. This is because past experience in diving medicine has shown that patients initially presented with only this symptom have a high likelihood of progression to neurological, Type II, DCS without prompt treatment. The marbling does not resolve until few days after treatment, but any pruritus (itching) will likely disappear upon initial recompression.
