= Sturge–Weber syndrome =

- Other names: Sturge–Weber–Krabbe disease
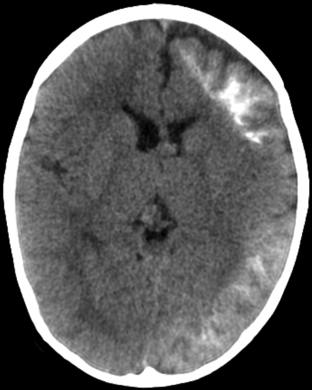
- CT scan of Sturge-Weber syndrome demonstrating brain calcification
- Specialty: Medical genetics
- Frequency: 0.005%

Sturge–Weber syndrome, sometimes referred to as encephalotrigeminal angiomatosis, is a rare type of phakomatosis, a congenital disorder that affects the central nervous system, skin, and eyes. It is often associated with port-wine stains of the face. Clinical manifestations include glaucoma, choroidal lesions, seizures, intellectual disability, and benign tumors of the blood vessels of the leptomeninges.

Sturge–Weber originates from embryonic development, resulting from errors in mesodermal and ectodermal development. Unlike other phakomatoses, Sturge–Weber occurs sporadically (i.e., does not have a hereditary cause). It is caused by a mosaic, somatic activating mutation occurring in the GNAQ gene.

Diagnosis is usually done through imaging; findings may include tram track calcifications in the cerebral cortex on a CT scan, angiomatosis of the pia mater, and hemicerebral atrophy. Managing Sturge–Weber focuses on treating the symptoms as they appear. Around 1 in 50,000 newborns are affected by the disease. It was originally described in 1879 by William Allen Sturge.

== Signs and symptoms ==
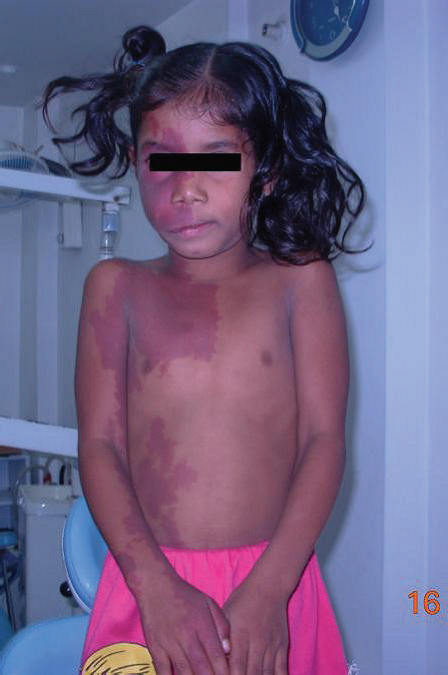
Port wine stains of an 8-year-old female with Sturge-Weber Syndrome

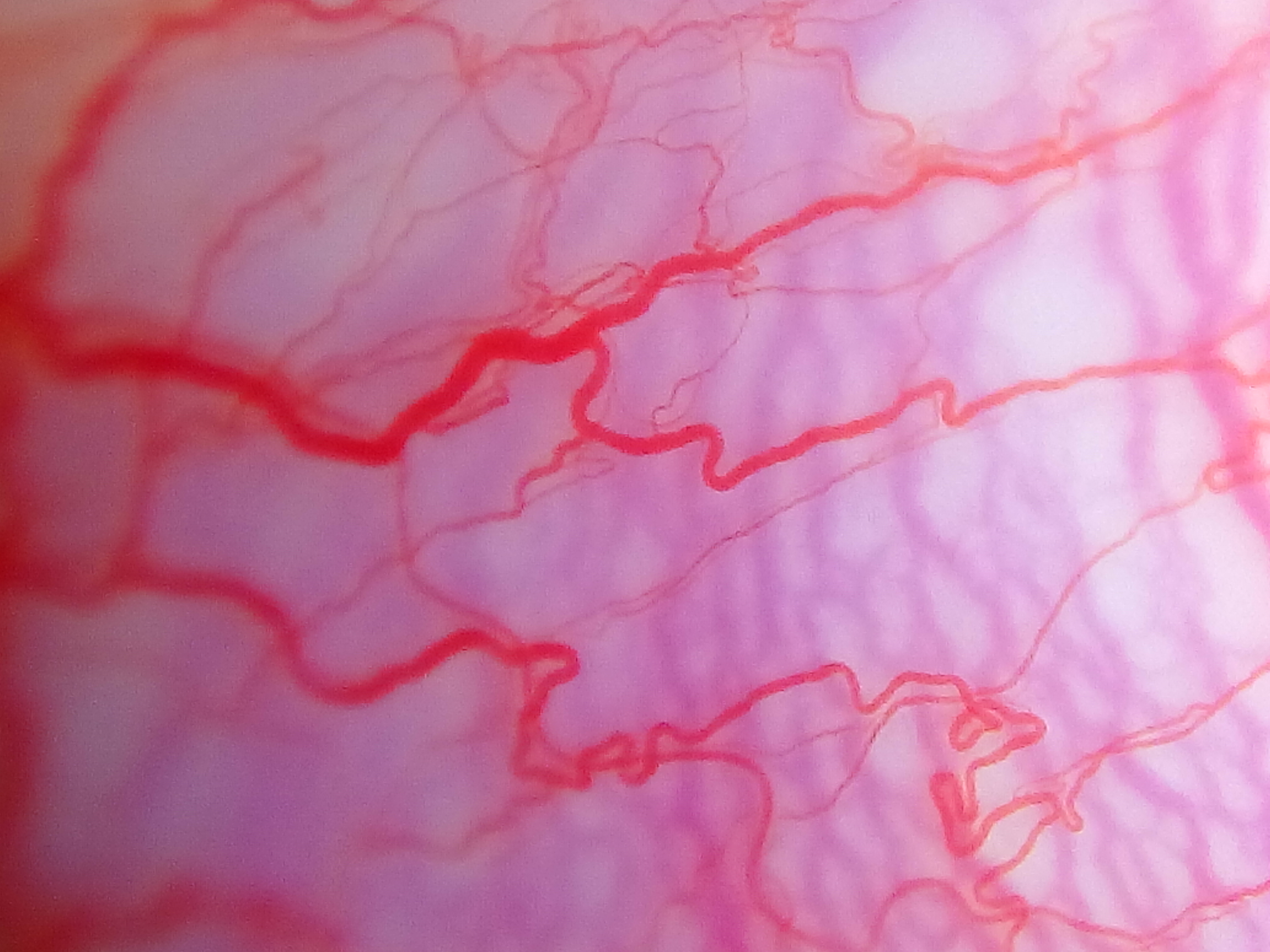
Dilated bulbar vessels in Sturge–Weber syndrome

Sturge–Weber syndrome is usually manifested at birth by a port-wine stain on the forehead and upper eyelid of one side of the face, or the whole face. The birthmark can vary in color from light pink to deep purple and is caused by an overabundance of capillaries around the ophthalmic branch of the trigeminal nerve, just under the surface of the face. There is also malformation of blood vessels in the pia mater overlying the brain on the same side of the head as the birthmark. This causes calcification of tissue and loss of nerve cells in the cerebral cortex.

Neurological signs include seizures that begin in infancy and may worsen with age. Convulsions usually happen on the side of the body opposite the birthmark, and vary in severity. There may also be muscle weakness on the side of the body opposite the birthmark.

Some children will have developmental delays and cognitive delays; about 50% will have glaucoma (optic neuropathy often associated with increased intraocular pressure), which can be present at birth or develop later. Glaucoma can be expressed as leukocoria, which should suggest further evaluation for retinoblastoma. Increased pressure within the eye can cause the eyeball to enlarge and bulge out of its socket (buphthalmos).

Sturge–Weber syndrome rarely affects other body organs.

Presentation	
Seizures	75–90%
Vascular headache	40–60%
Developmental (cognitive) delay	50–70%
Glaucoma	30–70%
Hemianopsia	40–45%
Hemiparesis	25–60%

== Cause ==
The blood vessel formations associated with SWS start in the fetal stage. Around the sixth week of development, a network of nerves develops around the area that will become a baby's head. Normally, this network goes away in the ninth week of development. In babies with SWS due to mutation of gene GNAQ, this network of nerves doesn't go away. This reduces the amount of oxygen and blood flowing to the brain, which can affect brain tissue development.

== Diagnosis ==
CT and MRI are most often used to identify intracranial abnormalities. When a child is born with a facial cutaneous vascular malformation covering a portion of the upper or the lower eyelids, imaging should be performed to screen for intracranial leptomeningeal angiomatosis. The haemangioma present on the surface of the brain is in the vast majority of cases on the same side as the birth mark and gradually results in calcification of the underlying brain and atrophy of the affected region.

=== Classification ===
Sturge–Weber syndrome can be classified into three different types. Type 1 includes facial and leptomeningeal angiomas as well as the possibility of glaucoma or choroidal lesions. Normally, only one side of the brain is affected. This type is the most common. Type 2 involvement includes a facial angioma (port wine stain) with a possibility of glaucoma developing. There is no evidence of brain involvement. Symptoms can show at any time beyond the initial diagnosis of the facial angioma. The symptoms can include glaucoma, cerebral blood flow abnormalities and headaches. More research is needed on this type of Sturge–Weber syndrome. Type 3 has leptomeningeal angioma involvement exclusively. The facial angioma is absent and glaucoma rarely occurs. This type is only diagnosed via brain scan.

== Treatment ==
Treatment for Sturge–Weber syndrome is symptomatic. Laser treatment may be used to lighten or remove the birthmark. Anticonvulsant medications may be used to control seizures. Doctors recommend early monitoring for glaucoma, and surgery may be performed on more serious cases. When one side of the brain is affected and anticonvulsants prove ineffective, the standard treatment is neurosurgery to remove or disconnect the affected part of the brain (hemispherectomy). Physical therapy should be considered for infants and children with muscle weakness. Educational therapy is often prescribed for those with intellectual disability or developmental delays, but there is no complete treatment for the delays. Brain surgery involving removing the portion of the brain that is affected by the disorder can be successful in controlling the seizures so that the patient has only a few seizures that are much less intense than pre-surgery. Surgeons may also opt to "switch-off" the affected side of the brain.

Latanoprost (Xalatan), a prostaglandin, may significantly reduce IOP (intraocular pressure) in patients with glaucoma associated with Sturge–Weber syndrome. Latanoprost is commercially formulated as an aqueous solution in a concentration of 0.005% preserved with 0.02% benzalkonium chloride (BAC). The recommended dosage of latanoprost is one drop daily in the evening, which permits better diurnal IOP control than does morning instillation. Its effect is independent of ethnicity, gender or age, and it has few to no side effects. Contraindications include a history of cystic macular edema (CME), epiretinal membrane formation, vitreous loss during cataract surgery, history of macular edema associated with branch retinal vein occlusion, history of anterior uveitis, and diabetes mellitus. It is also wise to advise patients that unilateral treatment can result in heterochromia or hypertrichosis that may become cosmetically objectionable.

Complication	Treatment (1st choice)	Treatment (2nd choice)
Glaucoma	Beta blocker drops	Adrenergic drops
Partial epilepsy	Carbamazepine	Valproate, topiramate
Headache	Ibuprofen	Sumatriptan
Stroke-like episodes	Aspirin	None
Neurobehavior	Methylphenidate	Clonidine

== Prognosis ==
Although it is possible for the birthmark and atrophy in the cerebral cortex to be present without symptoms, most infants will develop convulsive seizures during their first year of life. There is a greater likelihood of intellectual impairment when seizures are resistant to treatment. Studies do not support the widely held belief that seizure frequency early in life in patients who have SWS is a prognostic indicator.

== Epidemiology ==
It occurs in approximately 1 in 50,000 newborns.

== Eponym ==
It is named for William Allen Sturge and Frederick Parkes Weber.

== Society and culture ==
The Sturge-Weber Foundation's (The SWF) international mission is to improve the quality of life and care for people with Sturge–Weber syndrome and associated port wine birthmark conditions. It supports affected individuals and their families with education, advocacy, and research to promote effective management and awareness. The SWF was founded by Kirk and Karen Ball, who began searching for answers after their daughter was diagnosed with Sturge–Weber syndrome at birth. The SWF was incorporated in the US in 1987 as an International 501(c)(3) non-profit organization. In 1992, the mission was expanded to include individuals with capillary vascular birthmarks, Klippel Trenaunay (KT) and Port Wine Birthmarks. Sturge-Weber Syndrome | National Institute of Neurological Disorders and Stroke (nih.gov)}

The Hemispherectomy Foundation was formed in 2008 to assist families with children who have Sturge–Weber syndrome and other conditions that require hemispherectomy. The Brain Recovery Project was formed in 2011 to fund research and establish rehabilitation protocols to help children who have had hemispherectomy surgery reach their full potential.

Sturge Weber UK (SWUK), formerly Sturge-Weber Foundation UK, is a volunteer-run registered charity formed in 1990. The charity exists to support those affected by Sturge Weber syndrome, promote research into the condition and raise awareness of the condition amongst both public and professionals. The charity was instrumental in setting up a specialist Sturge Weber clinic at Great Ormond Street Hospital.
