= Jan Nolta =

American scientist

Jan A. Nolta
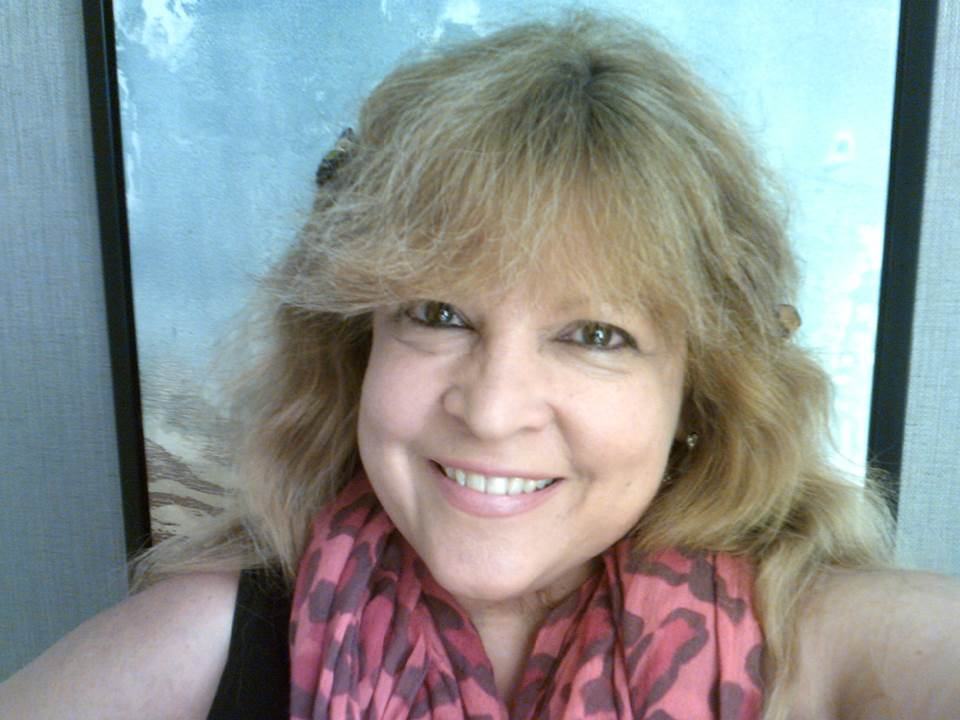
- Education: California State University, Sacramento; University of California, Davis; University of Southern California
- Awards: AAAS Fellow, Top 50 most influential global stem cell scientists
- Scientific career
- Fields: Stem Cells
- Workplaces: University of Southern California; Washington University in St. Louis; University of California, Davis

Jan A. Nolta is an American scientist and the director of the stem cell program at the UC Davis School of Medicine and Institute for Regenerative Cures. She is Scientific Director for the UC Davis Good Manufacturing Practice and editor of the journal Stem Cells. Nolta is known for her work with stem cell-related regenerative medicine. Nolta's current research focuses on treatment of Huntington's disease using mesenchymal stem cells. She was elected a AAAS Fellow in 2013.

== Career ==
Nolta received a Bachelor of Science degree in biology from California State University, Sacramento in 1984, took master’s classes at University of California, Davis, and later earned a Ph.D. in molecular microbiology from the University of Southern California. She was an assistant professor at USC Keck School of Medicine before becoming an associate professor at Washington University School of Medicine in St. Louis. After serving as scientific director of the Cell Processing and Gene Therapy Good Manufacturing Practice facility at Washington University in St. Louis, Nolta joined University of California, Davis in 2006.

While working towards her masters at UC Davis, Nolta was hired by Donald Kohn at the Children's Hospital Los Angeles and worked on gene therapy procedures.

Nolta now serves as the director of the Stem Cell Program at the UC Davis School of Medicine, as well as the director of the UC Davis Institute for Regenerative Cures, a facility supported by the California Institute for Regenerative Medicine (CIRM).

== Research ==
Nolta's research focuses on human stem cells and regenerative medicine therapies. Nolta's work focuses primarily on neurodegenerative diseases, especially therapeutics for Huntington's disease. She also studies Parkinson's disease, ALS, Liver disease, lysosomal storage diseases, and peripheral vascular disease. Her lab uses genetically engineered mesenchymal stem cells from the bone marrow of healthy donors to transport enzymes and proteins to other cells.

== Achievements ==
Nolta has acted as editor and editorial board member on eight scientific journals, including Stem Cells. She has published numerous peer-reviewed scientific journals and book chapters, and served on review panels for the National Institutes of Health and other grant-funding agencies.

== Works ==
- (ed) Genetic Engineering of Mesenchymal Stem Cells Springer Netherlands, 2006. ISBN 978-1-4020-3935-5
