= ARHGAP31 =

Protein-coding gene in the species Homo sapiens

Identifiers
- Aliases: ARHGAP31, AOS1, CDGAP, Rho GTPase activating protein 31
- External IDs: OMIM: 610911; MGI: 1333857; GeneCards: ARHGAP31

Gene location (Human)
Chr.	Chromosome 3 (human)
Band	3q13.32-q13.33	Start	119,294,383 bp
Band	3q13.32-q13.33	End	119,420,714 bp

Gene location (Mouse)
Chr.	Chromosome 16 (mouse)
Band	16|16 B4	Start	38,418,702 bp
Band	16|16 B4	End	38,533,636 bp
RNA expression pattern
Bgee	Human / Mouse (ortholog); Top expressed in: cardiac muscle tissue of right atrium; myocardium of left ventricle; trigeminal ganglion; skin of arm; right ventricle; vena cava; epithelium of colon; pancreatic ductal cell; synovial joint; synovial membrane / Top expressed in: right lung lobe; sciatic nerve; cumulus cell; atrium; left lung lobe; atrioventricular valve; endothelial cell of lymphatic vessel; seminal vesicula; epithelium of lens; external carotid artery; More reference expression data
BioGPS	n/a
Gene ontology
Molecular function	SH3 domain binding; GTPase activator activity
Cellular component	cytosol; cell junction; cell projection; focal adhesion; lamellipodium
Biological process	positive regulation of GTPase activity; regulation of small GTPase mediated signal transduction; signal transduction; small GTPase mediated signal transduction
Sources:Amigo / QuickGO
Orthologs
Databases	NCBI: entry; OMA: entry
Species	Human	Mouse
Entrez	57514	12549
Ensembl	ENSG00000031081	ENSMUSG00000022799
UniProt	Q2M1Z3	A6X8Z5
RefSeq (mRNA)	NM_020754	NM_020260
RefSeq (protein)	NP_065805	NP_064656
Location (UCSC)	Chr 3: 119.29 – 119.42 Mb	Chr 16: 38.42 – 38.53 Mb
PubMed search
- Wikidata
View/Edit Human	View/Edit Mouse

The Rho GTPase activating protein 31 is encoded in humans by the ARHGAP31 gene. It is a Cdc42/Rac1 GTPase regulator.

== Function ==
ARHGAP31 encodes a GTPase-activating protein (GAP). A variety of cellular processes are regulated by Rho GTPases which cycle between an inactive form bound to GDP and an active form bound to GTP. This cycling between inactive and active forms is regulated by guanine nucleotide exchange factors and GAPs. The encoded protein is a GAP shown to regulate two GTPases involved in protein trafficking and cell growth.

== Clinical relevance ==
ARHGAP31 mutations result in a loss of available active Cdc42 and consequently disrupt actin cytoskeletal structures, causing syndromic cutis aplasia and limb anomalies.
