= Hemispherectomy Foundation =

US non-profit organization

The Hemispherectomy Foundation
- Founded: June 23, 2008
- Purpose: "Dedicated to providing emotional, financial, and educational support for individuals and their families who have undergone or will undergo hemispherectomy brain surgery, or similar brain surgery."
- Location: Aledo, Texas, US
- Region served: international
- Method: Scholarships, Financial aid, Peer Support, Education.
- Key people: Cris Hall, executive director Kristi Hall, president and chief executive officer Jane Stefanik, VP and chief financial officer Ben Carson, M.D., honorary chair, medical advisory board
- Website: www.hemifoundation.org/

The Hemispherectomy Foundation is a 501(c)(3) non-profit organization founded to provide a support structure for children, and the families of children who have had or are preparing to have hemispherectomy brain surgery. The foundation also provides scholarships for college, trade schools, and summer camps, as well as financial assistance and other support as needed. It is based in Aledo, Texas.

== History ==
The Hemispherectomy Foundation was founded in 2008, when a six-year-old girl, Jessie Hall, was hospitalized with Rasmussen's encephalitis at Johns Hopkins Hospital. Jessie was undergoing hemispherectomy surgery (removal or disconnection of one-half of the brain) to control continuous seizures.

Although The Hemispherectomy Foundation is based in the United States, it provides support globally.

Ben Carson, M.D., director of pediatric neurosurgery, at Johns Hopkins Hospital in Baltimore, Maryland, is the honorary chair of the foundation's medical advisory board. He assumed this position in January, 2009.
