= Diffuse capillary malformation with overgrowth =

Blood vessel abnormality

Diffuse capillary malformation with overgrowth (DCMO) is a subset of capillary malformations (CM) associated with hypertrophy, i.e. increased size of body structures. CM can be considered an umbrella term for various vascular anomalies caused by increased diameter or number of capillary blood vessels. It is commonly referred to as "port-wine stain", and is thought to affect approximately 0.5% of the population. Typically capillaries in the papillary dermis are involved, and this gives rise to pink or violaceous colored lesions. The majority of DCMO lesions are diffuse, reticulated pale-colored stains.

DCMO is a unique entity from previously described vascular syndromes including: Klippel–Trenaunay syndrome, macrocephaly-capillary malformation syndrome , cutis marmorata telangiectatica congenita, CLOVES syndrome and Proteus syndrome. Careful evaluation must be made to rule out these vascular-complex syndromes from the differential diagnosis, as DCMO is considered a more common and benign condition.

== Classification ==
Limb complex-combined vascular abnormalities have been categorized based on underlying vascular defects, namely slow-flow capillary malformation and fast-flow capillary malformations. Fast-flow vascular malformations consist of arterial malformations, arteriovenous fistulae and arteriovenous malformations. Slow-flow vascular malformations include venous malformations, microcystic and macrocytic lymphatic malformations and capillary malformation. In this classification system, DCMO would fall under the slow-flow vascular malformation.

== Signs and symptoms ==
CM in DCMO is characteristically present at birth or during infancy. Appearance of the CM can be categorized into reticulate or homogenous pattern and pale or dark in color. Reticulate is defined as a non-uniform, mottled stain with indistinct demarcations, and homogenous is a uniform, solid color with distinct borders. Commonly, it affects multiple regions of the body. Lesions are pink or violaceous in color because capillaries in the papillary dermis are involved. Lesions are commonly diffuse, meaning that they extend contiguously greater than 2–3 cm beyond a region of involvement. Midline demarcations commonly affect the abdomen, but can also involve the back and buttocks.

There is usually overgrowth of at least one extremity, with possible overgrowth of face and body. Soft tissue and bony overgrowth proportionate to patient growth are the most common associated changes in DCMO. Typically there are no bone abnormalities on imaging. However, leg length discrepancy is observed in approximately half of patient cases. There have been cases of hemihypertrophy, which are associated with diffuse CM appearance. Although rare, there are reports of limb hypotrophy. Syndactyly and macrodactyly are observed in approximately one third of patients. DCMO is not commonly associated with developmental delay. Knowledge of diseases associated with DCMO in the fetus is limited. However, there is a reported case of a fetus with DCMO and a pleural effusion.

=== Associated condition ===
Patients with DCMO, just like other vascular malformations, may experience psychosocial distress such as social stigma, low self-esteem, and emotional stress typically beginning in adolescence. Parents of children with vascular malformations may also experience distress due to concerns regarding how their children may be treated by others. Potential psychological benefits from early laser treatment of port-wine stains have been reported in several studies. Similarly, early laser treatment should be pursued in DCMO to prevent psychosocial distress that may increase with age and patients or parents should be provided with psychosocial support when appropriate.

== Etiology ==
There is a somatic mosaic mutation in sporadic and syndromic capillary malformations in the GNAQ gene. Capillary malformations consist of endothelial cells that have a missense mutation in this gene at p.R183L and p.R183G. GNAQ gene encodes an alpha subunit of heterotrimeric G proteins that activates phospholipase. It is postulated that the underlying etiology in capillary malformations is due to the abnormal interaction between the mutated endothelial cells and non-mutated perivascular cells. Disease severity is thought to correlate with GNAQ mutant allele frequency. This could potentially be used as a prognostication of the disease. GNA11 is a mutation associated with capillary malformations causing overgrowth present on the extremities. Understanding the genetic basis may help establish and further improve current treatment modalities.

== Diagnosis ==
=== Differential Diagnosis ===
According to the International Society for Study of Vascular Anomalies (ISSVA), diagnosis and classification of vascular anomalies is made by clinical, radiological, pathological and hemodynamic characteristics. There are various conditions that present as vascular malformation and hypertrophy of soft tissue or bone. These include Klippel–Trenaunay syndrome, macrocephaly-capillary malformation syndrome, cutis marmorata telangiectatica congenita, CLOVES syndrome (congenital lipomatous overgrowth, vascular malformation, epidermal nevus, scoliosis), and Proteus syndrome. DCMO is a unique entity, and thus must be differentiated from these syndromes.

== Management ==
An interprofessional approach should be used for the medical management of DCMO patients.

Small CMs are typically benign and require no treatment. Large CMs should be treated due to aesthetic reasons and societal exclusion, as they have a higher tendency to hypertrophy. Pulse-dye laser photocoagulation should be used for large CM. Therapy should be initiated before the age of six months. Laser treatments typically have greater efficacy for CMs on face than non-facial areas such as distal extremities. Potential explanations for reduced efficacy in extremities include greater lesion size and deeper location of vessels due to thicker epidermis. Patients may be less inclined to pursue treatments for non-facial lesions due to lesser visibility and financial burden of multiple laser treatment sessions necessary for visible improvement. As DCMO frequently involves trunk and lower extremities, more studies are needed to improve laser treatment in non-facial areas and identify barriers to treatment.

Surgery is the last resort for non-responding hypertrophied CM. However, redarkening after laser treatment and recurrence of overgrowth after surgical excision are common.

Differences in leg length observed in DCMO can lead to problems with gait, joint pain and scoliosis. An orthopedic consultation should be made for patients with overgrowth involving bone. In Parkes-Weber syndrome, leg discrepancies > 2 cm require orthopedic evaluation. Similar recommendations can be assumed for the limb overgrowth in DCMO. Orthodontic evaluation can be made in presence of facial hypertrophy.

DCMO patients do not typically present with lymphatic malformations, therefore MRI studies or lymphangiography are not necessary. MRI is indicated if there is presence of lymphatic vessels, edema, or large veins. Similarly, AVMs are not present with DCMO, thus ultrasound/Doppler or arteriographies are not required. Patients with DCMO have not been reported to have developmental or neurological abnormalities, thus neuroimaging is not necessary. However, head circumference and neurologic development should be serially examined. Presence of neurological abnormality or macrocephaly can suggest macrocephaly-capillary malformation syndrome.

Hemihypertrophy-multiple lipomatosis or Beckwith–Wiedemann syndrome are diseases with total hypertrophy and are associated with an increased risk of Wilms' tumor. About 10% of DCMO cases present with total hemihypertrophy. Because of this, screening of Wilms' tumor is recommended in DCMO patients with total hemihypertrophy. However, vascular anomaly and soft tissue hypertrophy in the absence of hemihypertrophy have a low risk of Wilms' tumor.
