= Lymphohemangioma =

Lymphohemangioma is a disease characterized by swelling of the lymph nodes and blood vessels. It is variously described as a "mixture of clear fluid and blood-filled cysts", a mass of abnormal swollen veins and lymph nodes, or a tumorous growth of lymph and blood vessels. Oftentimes, it is described as a misnomer for combined lymphatic and capillary malformation. The lymphangiomas are known to be malformations of the lymph tissue, 75% of which is found near the head and neck. However, it can affect any region of the body. This disease is most commonly observed in children and male patients. In fact, Lymphangiomas account for 4% of all vascular tumors and 25% of the benign vascular tumors in children. Additionally, 50% of Lymphangiomas are noted at birth and become more evident by age 5.

== Signs and symptoms ==
- The main symptom for this disease is the appearance of the pigmented superficial vesicles on the surface of the skin, known as lymphangioma circumscriptum. These are clusters of the vesicles that have formed into small and firm blisters, commonly found in the areas of the neck, shoulders, armpit, limbs, mouth, and tongue. There are different types of lymphangioma based on the size of the masses.
  - Macrocystic, or lymphangiomas that are larger than 2 centimeters. Oftentimes, appear in blue-red pigmentation and spongy mass consistency.
  - Microcystic, or those vesicles that are smaller than 2 centimeters. They are known to grow or accumulate in clusters and appear to be in the form of tiny blisters. Also, are referred to as capillary lymphangiomas.
- Symptoms, or complications, differ based on the location of the vesicles.
  - In the tongue, it is known to cause speech and eating difficulties.
  - Lymphangioma within the eye socket, can cause double vision.
  - Difficulty breathing and chest pain may occur if found within the chest.
- Other symptoms for this disease include:
  - Swelling
  - Vomiting
  - Fever and chills
  - Blood-filled cysts behind the eye

== Mechanism ==
This disease is a result of a lymphatic malformation or abnormal development of the lymphatic system, also known as a lymphangiomia. The underlying cause of this rare disease is unknown in many of the cases. However, various studies have been conducted in regards to the pathology of this disease. The pathologic process involves the collection of lymphatic cisterns within the deep subcutaneous layer of the skin. These are separated from the fundamental network of lymph vessels. Communication between the superficial lymph vessels is achieved through dilated and vertical lymph channels. The malformation arises from when the primitive lymph sac is unable to connect with the rest of the lymphatic system during embryonic development. This disruption leads to the production of a thick coat of muscle fibers that cause rhythmic contractions which increase the intramural pressure. The added pressure causes the dilated channels to extend from the deep walls of the cisterns outward to the skin. Findings from a study performed in 1976 by Whimster, suggested that the vesicles noted in lymphangioma are actually outpouchings of the dilated projected vessels. This idea was furthermore supported by radiographic studies that displayed large multiobulated cisterns that lay deep into the dermis and beyond clinical lesions. These studies concluded that lymphangiomas display no evidence of communication with the rest of the normal lymphatics. Furthermore, emphasizing the idea that the cause of this disease is a failure of primitive lymph sacs to connect with the lymphatic system.

== Diagnosis ==
Diagnosis for this disease is most commonly performed through a physical examination. Usually, the presence of this condition is evident due to the characteristic of clinical appearance. However, a series of examinations can be ordered to confirm the diagnosis depending on the location of the masses.

- Ultrasonography, can be ordered when the vessels are found on the superficial layer of the skin
- Computed tomography (CT) with an IV contrast enhancement can be used for those cystic lesions found on the deeper layers of the skin.
- Magnetic resonance imaging (MRI) is useful for the evaluation of complex vascular lesions that involve the lymphatic system and extremities.

== Treatment ==
The treatment options for this disease vary depending on the size, location, and type of mass. Additionally, another factor that should be taken into consideration is whether or not the mass is causing symptoms.

- Surgical excision is oftentimes used for the more superficial masses.
- Sclerotherapy is an alternative treatment, which involves injecting a chemical agent that causes the mass to shrink.
- Radiofrequency ablation (laser therapy) can be used for lymphangioma circumscriptum, or small blisters. This high frequency method is used to remove the masses by destroying the abnormal tissue. However, with time they can recur after removal.

== Prognosis ==
The general outlook for people who have been diagnosed with this disease is considered to be good due to the fact that the masses are known to be benign and do not develop into cancer. However, it can impact the quality of life of the individual based on the size and location of the mass. Although, there are several treatment options known for this disease, the masses tend to regrow with time. It is estimated that between 50 and 100% of people who have a mass only partially removed will experience recurrence.

== Research ==
This disease remains rare within our population, due to its low rate of incidence. However, it has remained a topic of research and interest for the past several decades. It is recommended that these types of cases be managed by an interprofessional health team that includes a pediatrician, surgeon, dermatologist, and primary care provider. Since this disease is fairly rare, patient education has been deemed of significant importance. Experts have emphasized that proper education can help make this disease easier to cope with. Patients should be aware of the associated complications of this disease such as lymphatic leaks and chronic wounds. Additionally, treatment options should be explained to patients as not all options are effective. The Lymphatic Education and Research Network in New York City, is an organization that has been established in order to provide support and improve the quality of life of those with the disease. Lastly, current research is being targeted to a new approach to treatment of rare pediatric Lymphangioma which involves the development of targeted therapy. This therapy would be implemented as a postoperative form of treatment. Targeted therapy would improve the prognosis of the lesions and recurrence rate for those with more aggressive or recurrent behavior.
