= Cobb syndrome =

- Other names: Spinal arteriovenous metameric syndrome

Cobb syndrome is a rare congenital disorder characterized by visible skin lesions and spinal angiomas or arteriovenous malformations (AVMs). The skin lesions of Cobb syndrome typically are present as port wine stains or angiomas, but reports exist of angiokeratomas, angiolipomas, and lymphangioma circumscriptum. The intraspinal lesions may be angiomas or AVMs and occur at levels of the spinal cord corresponding to the affected skin dermatomes. They may in turn produce spinal cord dysfunction and weakness or paralysis.

The disorder was first described by Berenbruch in 1890, but became widely known only after Cobb's report in 1915. Cobb syndrome is thought to have no sex predilection, but there have been less than 100 cases reported in the literature. It is believed to be due to a sporadic mutation, since parents of affected children usually have no evidence of the disease.

== Signs and symptoms ==
The disease is present at birth, but clinical manifestations are often not seen until later in life. Patients typically experience the sudden onset of pain, numbness, or weakness in their extremities as children or young adults. These symptoms may remit or remain stable and often can be localized below a specific dermatome. Symptoms tend to worsen over time either by discrete steps or continuously. Early development of weakness may portend a more aggressive course. Less commonly, weakness or bowel and bladder dysfunction may be presenting symptoms.

The major debility from Cobb syndrome is the onset of weakness, paresis, sensory loss, and loss of bowel and bladder control. A possible complication if treatment is delayed is Foix-Alajouanine syndrome or subacute necrotic myelopathy due to thrombosis in the spinal angioma.

Cutaneous lesions may be distributed anywhere in the dermatome, from midline back to abdomen. Midline back lesions may be associated with spina bifida. The cutaneous lesion may be very faint and may be more pronounced when the patient performs a Valsalva maneuver which increases abdominal pressure and causes preferential filling of the cutaneous angioma. Neurological examination will reveal weakness or paralysis and numbness or decreased sensation with a sharp upper cutoff.

== Diagnosis ==
Cobb Syndrome is diagnosed by MRI, supplemented by medullary angiography.

== See also ==
- Klippel–Trénaunay–Weber syndrome
- List of cutaneous conditions
