= Inouwa =

Belief in reincarnation in Igbo mythology

Inouwa // or Ilouwa is the Igbo belief in reincarnation in their mythology, which translates from Igbo to English as to come back to the world. Reincarnation is believed to occur between immediate and extended family and sometimes the person who is reincarnated notifies the family, before their death, who they will come back to the world as.

== Reincarnation ==
Relatives identify the reincarnated ancestor by checking the newborn for body markings/birthmarks or physical features the ancestor had had. Statements as well as the behavior of the baby similar to the deceased ancestor is made to confirm the identity of who the child was in their past life. Oracles can also confirm the identity of the baby in their past life.

== Ogbanje ==
In the Igbo cosmology, there are three worlds - one inhabited by the unborn, another where the living people inhabit and the last where dead people reside. However, some beings are said to be move easily from one world to another and reincarnate how and when they want to. These class of beings are called Ogbanje, that is one that goes and comes back. Ogbanje are the negative or evil spirits that are reincarnated to cause misfortune to the family by constantly dying and coming back again.
