= Nevus flammeus nuchae =

Naevus flammeus nuchae
- Other names: Stork bite or Nevus simplex
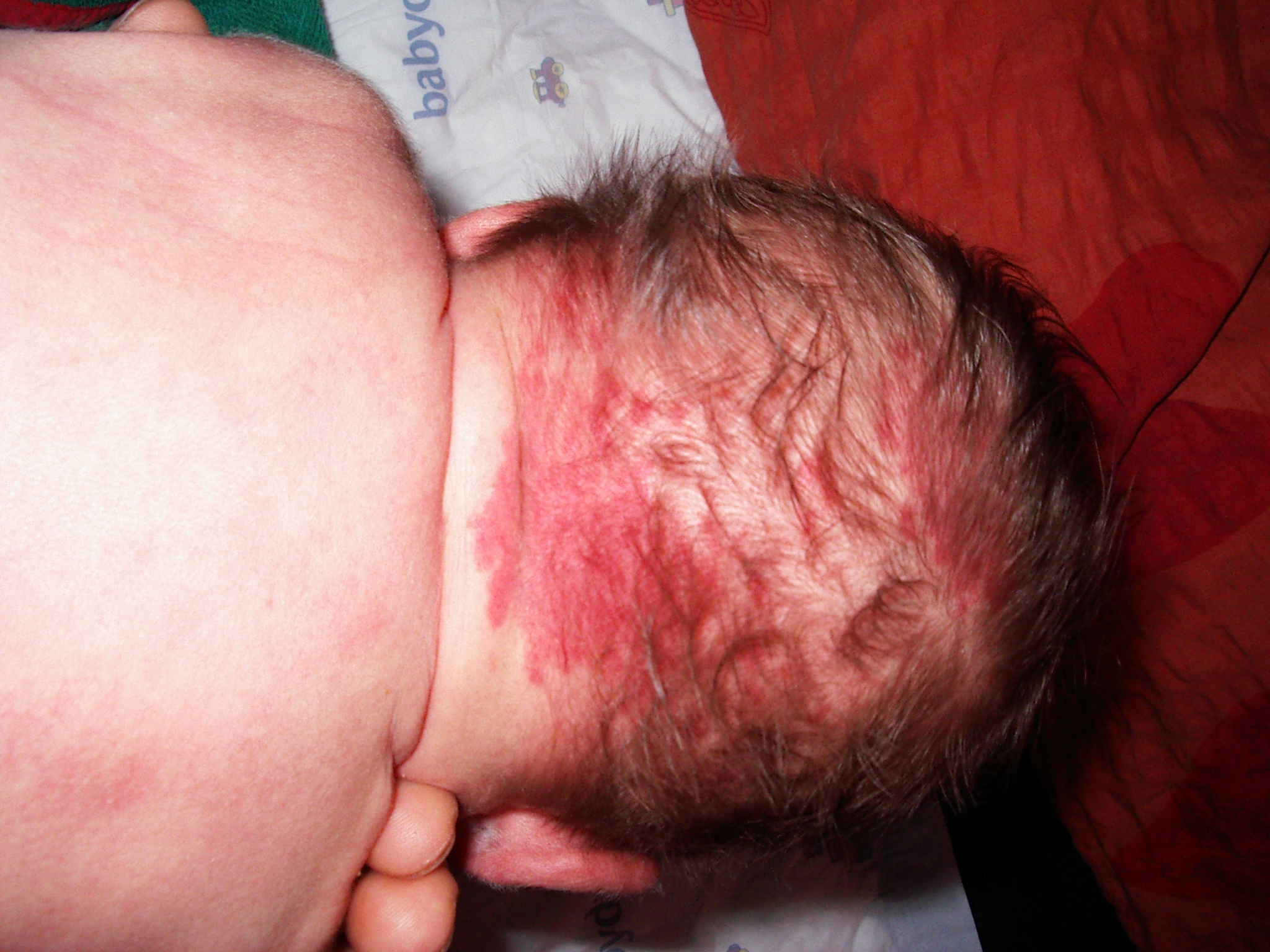
- Specialty: Dermatology

Naevus flammeus nuchae, or colloquially stork bite, is a congenital capillary malformation present in newborns. It is a common type of birthmark in a newborn.

== Prevalence and symptoms ==
Stork bites occur in a significant number of newborns, with estimates ranging from 22–40 percent to 40–70 percent; they are reported more frequently for white babies than for infants of other races. They result from a dilation of capillaries in the skin, and may become darker when the child cries or strains.

The birthmarks, which are pinkish and irregularly shaped, occur most frequently on the nape of the neck; however, they are also common on the forehead, eyelids and upper lip. A baby may be born with a stork bite, or the birthmark may appear in the first months of life. They may also be found occasionally on other parts of the body. The skin is usually not thickened and feels no different from anywhere else on the body; the only difference being appearance. However, vascular excrescences can occur, which often turn blue or purple over time.

== Diagnosis ==
A doctor can diagnose a stork bite with a simple visual inspection. No tests are needed.

== Treatment ==
No treatment is needed. If a stork bite lasts longer than 3 years, it may be removed using laser surgery.

== Outlook ==
Most stork bites on the face go away completely in about 18 months. Stork bites on the back of the neck usually do not go away.

== Etymology ==
"Nevus flammeus nuchae" is Latin for "flame-like mole on the nape." Nevus flammeus in other contexts refers to a port-wine stain, which is a more permanent mark. The term "stork bite" refers to the folklore idea that storks bring newborn babies to parents.

== See also ==
- Midline naevus flammeus, also known as an angel's kiss or a salmon patch.
- Mongolian spot
- Naevus flammeus, better known as a port-wine stain.
- Skin lesion
