= Hallux varus =

Medial deviation of the great toe at the metatarsophalangeal joint

- Other names: Sandal gap
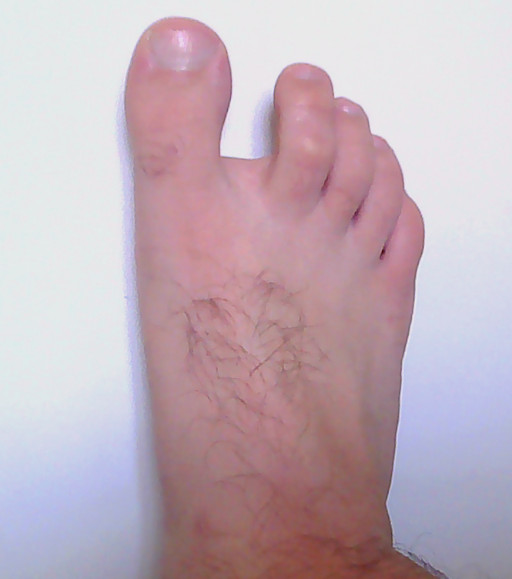
- A right foot with hallux varus
- Specialty: Orthopedic

Hallux varus, also commonly referred to as sandal gap, is a clinical condition characterized by medial deviation of the great toe at the metatarsophalangeal joint. This condition, when acquired by adults, is usually caused by sports injury, surgical overcorrection of hallux valgus, or underlying causes such as arthritides.

A sandal gap that is congenital and not caused by an injury can be a normal variant, and can be visible on a pre-natal ultrasound as early as the second trimester. However, it is also considered to be a "soft sign" associated with an increased likelihood of a genetic abnormality, including Down's Syndrome, CLOVES syndrome, and at least forty other rare conditions. One 2011 study of the common morphological features in autistic children (sample size of n=421) found that 59% of the children in the study had a sandal gap, the most common morphological abnormality in the group.

In places where modern shoes whose toe boxes are excessively narrow have not been worn, normal feet can be mistaken for hallux varus.

The "sandal gap" is a phenomenon in which, due to the lack of a restrictive toe box in sandals, the toes can actuate unrestricted, so one may end up with any number of aligned and misaligned toes depending on how often one uses either sandals or narrow toe box shoes at any given time throughout one's life.

== Photos ==
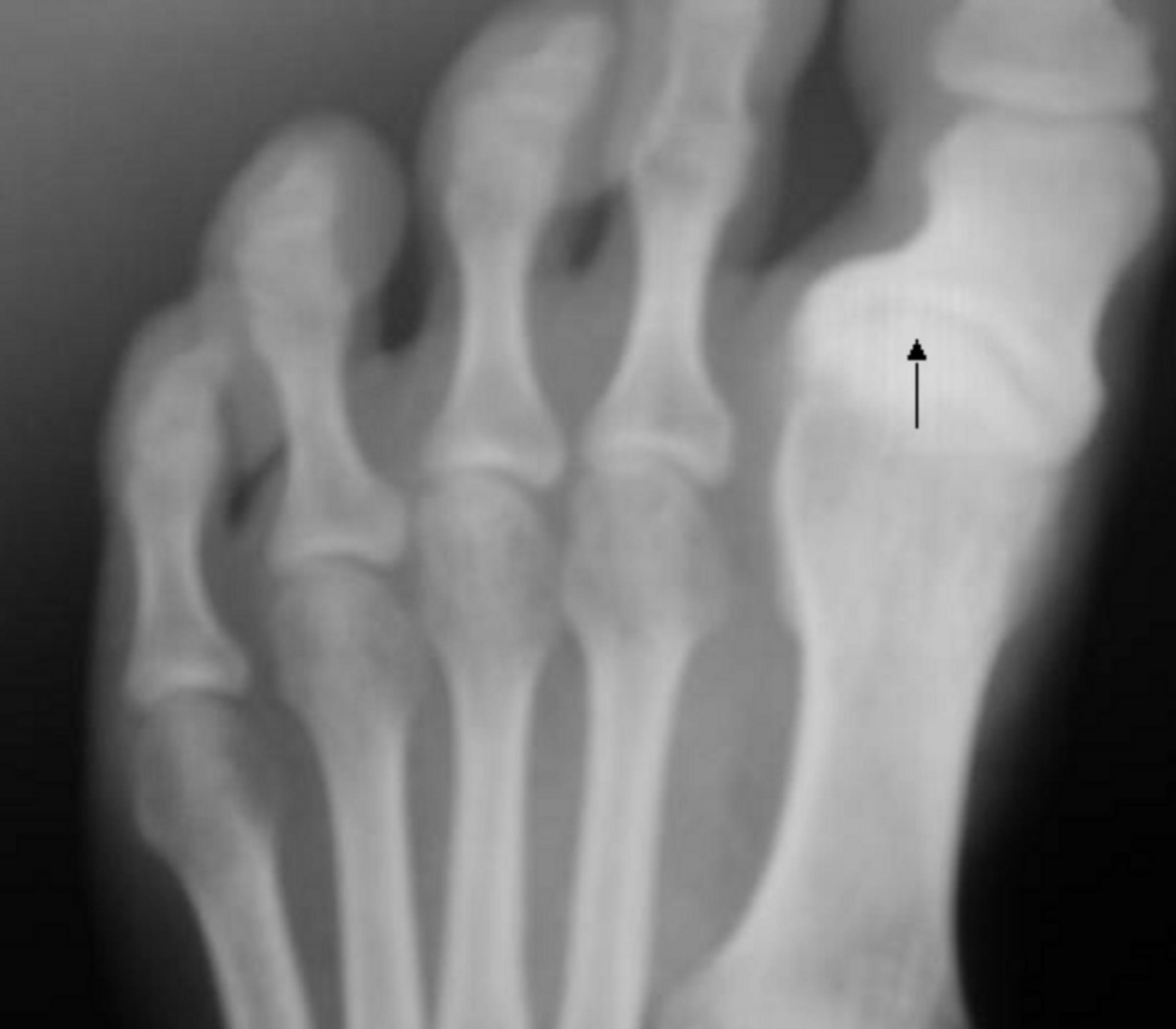
Radiography of the left foot of a young male showing progressive hallux varus
