= Hemifacial hypertrophy =

- Other names: Friedreich's disease
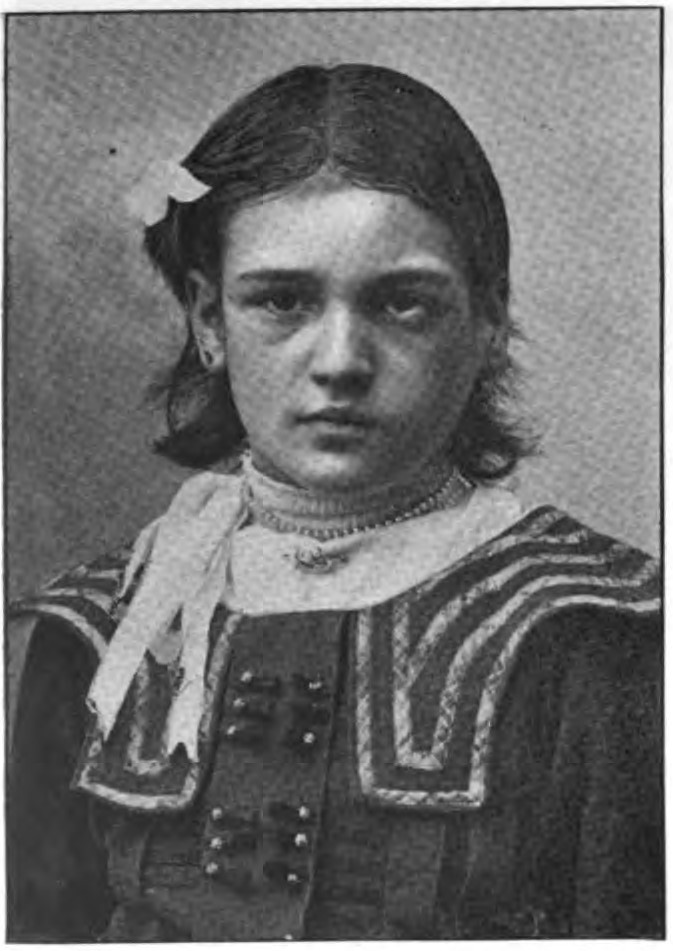
- Left-side HFH in a 10-year-old girl

This condition is inherited in an autosomal dominant manner.

Hemifacial hypertrophy (also termed facial hemihypertrophy, facial hemihyperplasia, or Friedreich's disease) abbreviated as (HFH) is rare congenital disease characterized by unilateral enlargement of the head and teeth. It is classified as true HFH (THFH) with unilateral enlargement of the viscerocranium, and partial HFH (PHFH) in which not all structures are enlarged. Hemifacial hypertrophy can cause a wide spectrum of defects or may involve only muscle or bone. it is usually treated surgically. It is believed to be a minor form of hemihypertrophy.
