= Microcystic lymphatic malformation =

- Specialty: Interventional radiology dermatology

Microcystic lymphatic malformations are a lymphatic malformation and vascular anomaly characterized by aggregations of ill-defined, abnormal, microscopic lymphatic channels.

== See also ==
- Lymphatic malformations
- Vascular anomalies
- Cystic lymphatic malformation
