= CLOVES syndrome =

- Other names: Congenital Lipomatous Overgrowth-Vascular malformation-Epidermal nevi-Spinal anomaly syndrome
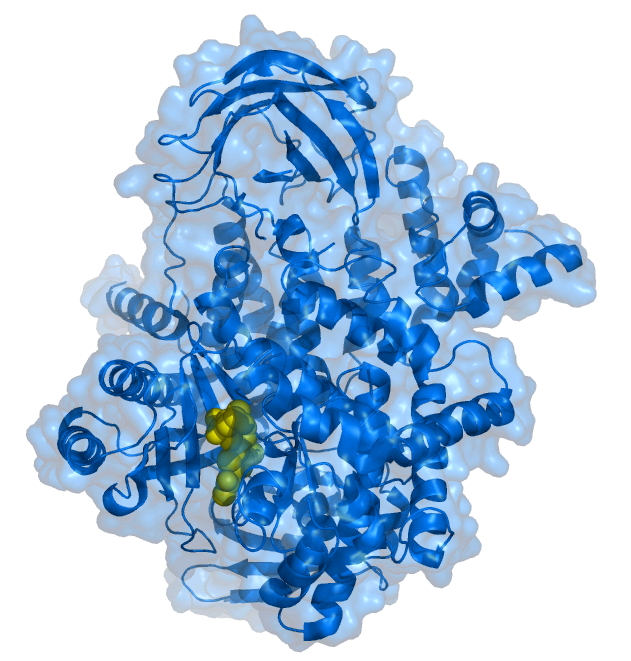
- Mutations affecting PI3kinase are involved in the cause of this condition
- Frequency: 0.0001%

Congenital Lipomatous Overgrowth, Vascular Malformations, Epidermal Nevis, Spinal/Skeletal Anomalies/Scoliosis (CLOVES) syndrome is a very rare congenital (present at birth) disorder characterized by a combination of vascular (involving the blood vessels), skin, spinal, and bone or joint abnormalities.

Fewer than 200 cases of CLOVES syndrome have been identified worldwide to date. CLOVES is thought to be caused by mutations in a gene called PIK3CA. The long-term picture for a child with CLOVES depends on age and how serious the symptoms are. The sooner the disease is detected and the proper course of treatment is started, the better the general outlook.

CLOVES is a rare overgrowth syndrome with complex vascular anomalies. CLOVES syndrome affects people with various symptoms, ranging from mild fatty soft-tissue tumors to vascular malformations encompassing the spine or internal organs.

It is a genetic disorder that results from somatic, mosaic gain-of-function mutations of the PIK3CA gene, and belongs to the spectrum of PIK3CA-related overgrowth syndromes (PROS).

In 2018 French doctor Guillaume Canaud published an article in Nature that demonstrate the efficacy of BYL719 (From cancer), an inhibitor of PIK3CA, in preventing and improving organ dysfunction.

CLOVES syndrome is closely linked to other overgrowth disorders like proteus syndrome, Klippel–Trénaunay syndrome, Sturge–Weber syndrome, and hemihypertrophy, to name a few.

'CLOVES' is an acronym for:

- C is for congenital.
- L is for lipomatous, which means pertaining to or resembling a benign tumor made up of mature fat cells. Most CLOVES patients present with a soft fatty mass at birth, often visible on one or both sides of the back, legs and/or abdomen.
- O is for overgrowth, because there is an abnormal increase in the size of the body or a body part that is often noted at birth. Patients with CLOVES may have affected areas of their bodies that grow faster than in other people. Overgrowth of extremities (usually arms or legs) is seen, with large wide hands or feet, large fingers or toes, wide space between fingers, and asymmetry of body parts.
- V is for vascular malformations, which are blood vessel abnormalities. Patients with CLOVES have different venous, capillary, and lymphatic channels - typically capillary, venous and lymphatic malformations are known as "slow flow" lesions. Some patients with CLOVES have combined lesions (which are fast flow) and some have aggressive vascular malformation known as arteriovenous malformations (AVM). The effect of a vascular malformation varies per patient based on the type, size, and location of the malformation, and symptoms can vary.
- E is for Epidermal naevi, which are sharply-circumscribed chronic lesions of the skin, and benign. These are often flesh-colored, raised or warty.
- S is for Spinal/Skeletal Anomalies or scoliosis. Some patients with CLOVES have tethered spinal cord, vascular malformations in or around their spines, and other spinal differences. High-flow aggressive spinal lesions (like AVM) can cause serious neurological deficits/paralysis.

The syndrome was first recognised by Saap and colleagues who recognised the spectrum of symptoms from a set of seven patients. In this initial description the syndrome is named CLOVE syndrome. It is believed that the first description of a case of CLOVES syndrome was written by Hermann Friedberg, a German physician, in 1867.

== Causes ==
Somatic mutations in the PIK3CA have been identified as a cause of CLOVES syndrome. PIK3CA is a protein involved in the PI3K-AKT signalling pathway. Mutations in other parts of this pathway cause other overgrowth syndromes including Proteus syndrome and hemimegalencephaly.
