= Hermann Friedberg =

German physician (1817–1884)

Hermann Friedberg (5 July 1817 – 2 March 1884) was a German medical doctor from Rosenberg (Olesno), Silesia.

He studied at the universities of Berlin, Vienna, Prague, Paris, and Breslau, receiving from the last-named the degree of doctor of medicine in 1840. From 1849 to 1852 he was an assistant at the surgical hospital of the University of Berlin, and in 1852 was admitted as a privatdozent in surgery and pharmacology to the medical faculty of the Berlin University, at the same time conducting a private hospital for the treatment of surgical and ophthalmological diseases. In 1866 he was appointed professor of pharmacology at the University of Breslau, where he later died.

It is believed that Friedberg wrote the first description of CLOVES syndrome.

== Literary works ==
Friedberg wrote many essays on surgical and pharmacological topics, but latterly devoted himself especially to medical jurisprudence. He was a collaborator on:

- Eulenberg's Handbuch des Oeffentlichen Sanitätswesens
- a contributor to the Vierteljahresschrift für Gerichtliche Medizin und Oeffentliches Sanitätswesen
- to Virchows Archiv für Pathologische Anatomie und Physiologie und für Klinische Medizin

He is also the author of:

- Pathologie und Therapie der Muskellähmung, Vienna, 1858 (2d ed., Leipzig, 1862);
- Die Vergiftung Durch Kohlendunst, Berlin, 1866;
- Gerichtsärztliche Gutachten, Erste Reihe, Brunswick, 1875;
- Gerichtsärztliche Praxis. Vierzig Gutachten, Vienna and Leipzig, 1881.
