= Stanley Cobb =

American neurologist (1887–1968)

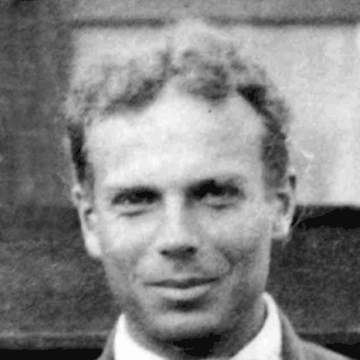
- Stanley Cobb
- Born: December 10, 1887; Brookline, Massachusetts
- Died: February 25, 1968 (aged 80); Cambridge, Massachusetts
- Education: Johns Hopkins School of Medicine; Harvard Medical School (M.D.); Harvard
- Years active: 1925-1954
- Known for: Biological psychiatry
- Medical career
- Profession: Neurologist
- Institutions: Massachusetts General Hospital; Boston City Hospital; Harvard Medical School
- Research: Neuroanatomy; Neuropathology; Convulsive disorders Somatic disorders
- Awards: Kober medal

Stanley Cobb (December 10, 1887 – February 25, 1968) was a neurologist and could be considered "the founder of biological psychiatry in the United States".

== Early life ==
Cobb was born on December 10, 1887, in Brookline, Massachusetts, to John Candler Cobb. His great-grandmother, Augusta Adams Cobb, abandoned her husband and married Mormon prophet Brigham Young as his third wife (out of some 56 wives) in 1843. Cobb's childhood and education were affected by his stammer, which it is suggested led him to study the neurosciences in an attempt to understand its cause. He married Elizabeth Mason Almy in 1915.

As early as 1910, Cobb was published in ornithological journals and he continued to publish natural history articles throughout his life. Cobb studied biology at Harvard College (AB, 1911), and medicine at Harvard Medical School (MD, 1914). After army service and a residency at Johns Hopkins Medical School, he was hired in 1919 to teach neurology at Harvard Medical School. In 1922, Cobb was asked to discover why patients with epilepsy had improved when they were starved. He recruited William Lennox as an assistant to investigate the ketogenic diet that had been proposed as being as effective as starvation in the treatment of epilepsy. In 1915 he reported a disorder which became widely known as Cobb syndrome. In 1925 he was named Harvard's Bullard Professor of Neuropathology.

== Career ==
In 1930, he was appointed director of the newly opened Harvard Neurological Unit at Boston City Hospital. When Cobb moved to the Massachusetts General Hospital in 1934, he was succeeded by Tracey Putnam. Cobb built the department of psychiatry at the Massachusetts General Hospital. He championed psychoanalysis, giving it respectability when others in that conservative hospital disapproved. He published an annual review of neuropsychiatry in the Archive of Internal Medicine from 1935 to 1959.

When Carl Jung was invited in 1936 to receive an honorary degree by Harvard, he stayed with Cobb. Jung "put his shoes outside his bedroom door to have them shined. Cobb polished them".

== Retirement ==
"It is enough immortality for me if I may become even a very small part of advancing wisdom, hoping that I have done my bit to make the world a better place."

— Stanley Cobb

When he retired in 1954, Cobb directed his interest towards the study of avian neurology. He was passionately opposed to the widespread spraying of DDT. After his favourite pond was sprayed, he was angered to write "Death of a Salt Pond", a difficult task, since he was virtually blind by then. This was first published in a local paper but interest gathered and it achieved widespread circulation after being republished in the Audubon Magazine in May, 1963.

Cobb died in Cambridge, Massachusetts, on February 25, 1968, at the age of 80.

== Mind-body problem ==
Throughout his professional career, Cobb was troubled by the attempts of medical scientists to draw hard-and-fast distinctions between mental and physical symptoms, between psychic and somatic causes, between functional and organic diseases, and even between psychology and physiology. Cobb addressed the mind-body problem in Borderlands of Psychiatry (1943):

I solve the mind-body problem by stating that there is no such problem. There are, of course, plenty of problems concerning the "mind", and the "body", and all intermediate levels of integration of the nervous system. What I wish to emphasize is that there is no problem of "mind" versus "body", because biologically no such dichotomy can be made. The dichotomy is an artefact; there is no truth in it, and the discussion has no place in science in 1943... The difference between psychology and physiology is merely one of complexity. The simpler bodily processes are studied in physiological departments; the more complex ones that entail the highest levels of neural integration are studied in psychological departments. There is no biological significance to this division; it is simply an administrative affair, so that the university president will know what salary goes to which professor.

== Awards and recognition ==
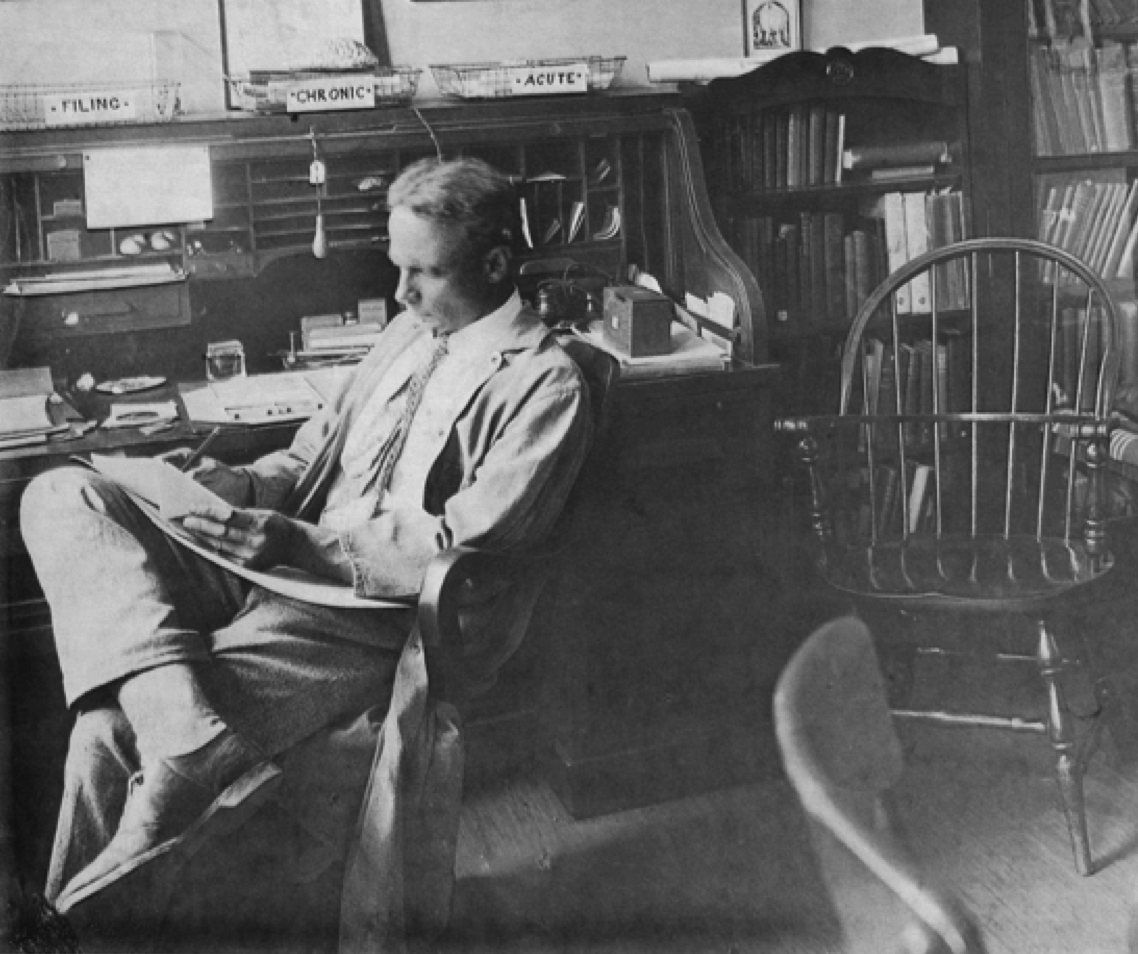
Stanley Cobb in his office at Harvard Medical School, 1922.

In 1956, Cobb received the George M. Kober Medal for his contributions to medicine. In 1960, Harvard Medical School established the Stanley Cobb Chair in his honor. In 1967, Cobb received a Distinguished Service Award from the New York Academy of Medicine.

== Selected works ==
- Borderlands of Psychiatry. Harvard University Press. January 1943.
- Foundations of Neuropsychiatry. Williams & Wilkins. January 1952. OCLC 536824.
