= Mongolian spot =

Type of birthmark

Slate grey nevus
- Other names: Mongolian spot, Mongolian blue spot, congenital dermal melanocytosis, dermal melanocytosis
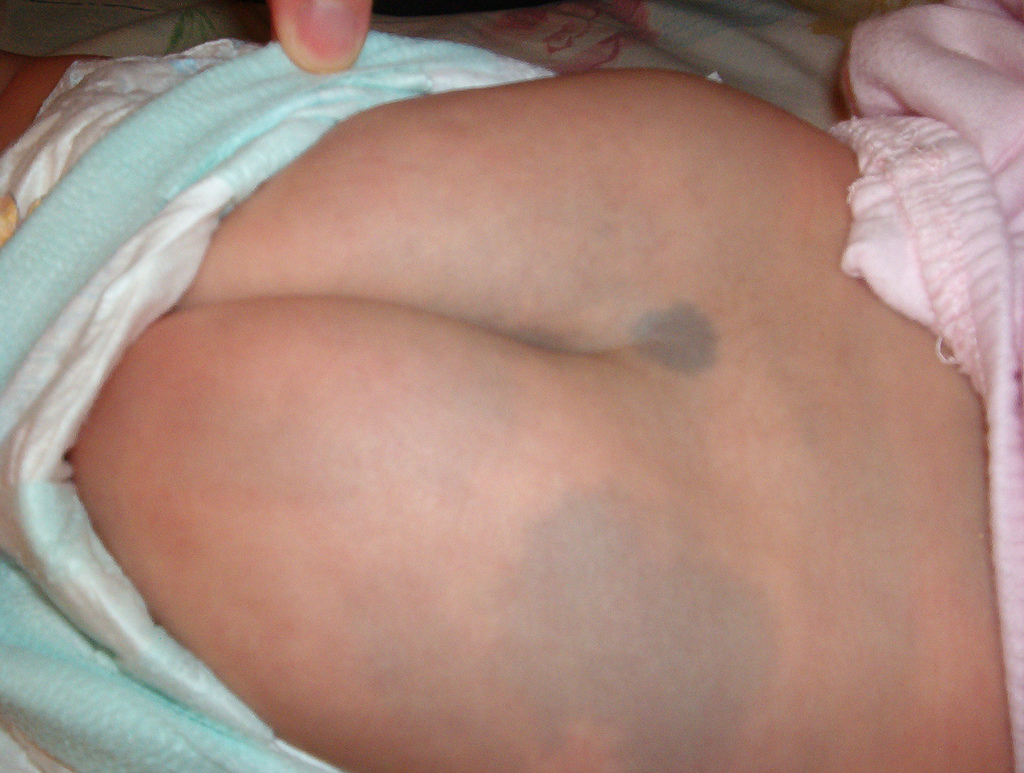
- Infant with slate grey nevus
- Specialty: Dermatology

A Mongolian spot, also known as a slate grey nevus or congenital dermal melanocytosis, is a benign, flat, congenital birthmark with wavy borders and an irregular shape. In 1883, it was described and named after Mongolians by Erwin Bälz, a German anthropologist based in Japan, who believed it to be most prevalent among his Mongolian patients. It normally disappears three to five years after birth and almost always by puberty. The most common color is blue, although they can be blue-gray, blue-black or deep brown.

== Cause ==
Mongolian spot is a congenital developmental condition—that is, one existing from birth—exclusively involving the skin. The blue colour is caused by melanocytes, melanin-containing cells, that are usually located in the surface of the skin (the epidermis), but are in the deeper region (the dermis) in the location of the spot. Usually, as multiple spots or one large patch, it covers one or more of the lumbosacral area (lower back), the buttocks, sides, and shoulders. It results from the entrapment of melanocytes in the lower half to two-thirds of the dermis during their migration from the neural crest to the epidermis during embryonic development.

Male and female infants are equally predisposed to slate grey nevi. People who are not aware of the background of slate grey nevi may mistake them for bruises, possibly resulting in mistaken concerns about abuse.

=== Anthropological description ===
The French anthropologist Robert Gessain interested himself in what he called the tache pigmentaire congénitale or coloured birthmark, publishing multiple papers in the Journal de la Société des Américanistes, an academic journal covering the cultural anthropology of the Americas. Gessain spent time with the Huehuetla Tepehua people in Hidalgo, Mexico, and wrote in 1947 about the spot's "location, shape, colour, histology, chemistry, genetic transmission, and racial distribution". He had previously spent several winters in Greenland, and wrote an overview in 1953 of what was known about the spot. He hypothesised that the age at which it faded in various populations might prove to be a distinguishing characteristic of those groups. Gessain claimed that the spot was first observed amongst the Inuit.

Hans Egede Saabye, a Danish priest and botanist, spent 1770–1778 in Greenland. His diaries, published in 1816 and translated into several European languages, contained much ethnographic information. He described the spot on newborns, saying he had seen it often when the infants were presented naked for baptism. A second Danish observer was doctor and zoologist Daniel Frederik Eschricht, mainly based in Copenhagen. In 1849 he wrote of the "mixed" babies he had delivered at the lying-in hospital. He also says that "the observation made for the first time by Saabye about Inuit children has been completely confirmed by Captain Holbøll", who sent him a fetus pickled in alcohol.

Gessain goes on to state that it was only in 1883 that an anthropologist mentions the spot. It was Erwin Bälz, a German working in Tokyo, who described a dark blue mark on Japanese infants. He presented his findings in 1901 in Berlin, and from that point on, Bälz's name was associated with certain skin cells containing pigment. Captain Gustav Frederik Holm wrote in 1887 that his Greenlandic interpreter Johannes Hansen (known as Hanserak) attested to the existence of the birthmark over the kidney region of newborns, which grows larger as they grow older. That year, the Danish anthropologist Soren Hansen drew the connection between the observations of Bälz in Japan and Saabye in Greenland. "This cannot be a coincidence. It is not the first time that the resemblance between the Japanese and the Eskimo has been pointed out." Fridtjof Nansen, the Norwegian polar explorer, said that the spot was widespread in the mixed Danish-Inuit population of West Greenland. Soren Hansen confirmed this. A missionary in Bethel, Alaska, a traditional gathering place of Yup'ik people, reported that the spots were common on children. Rudolf Trebitsch, an Austrian linguist and ethnologist, spent the summer of 1906 on the West Coast of Greenland, and listed all the examples he came across. Gessain went to north Labrador in 1926, looking for children with these spots. In 1953 Dr Saxtorph, medical advisor to the Greenland department (part of the Danish government), wrote that the Greenlanders do not like outsiders to see or discuss these birthmarks; "they doubtless feel as a reminiscence of the time when they lived on a low cultural level".

The presence or absence of the slate grey nevus was used by racial theorists such as Joseph Deniker (1852–1918), the French anthropologist.

The Journal of Cutaneous Diseases Including Syphilis, Volume 23 contained several accounts of the slate grey nevus on children in the Americas:

Holm ("Ethnological Sketch. Communications on Greenland", X., Copenhagen, 1887) announced the presence of the spot in the east part of Greenland. Bartels ("The So-Called 'Mongolian' Spots on Infants of Esquimaux", Ethnologic Review, 1903) received letters regarding it from East Greenland and also from Esquimaux of Alaska. In half-breed European-Esquimaux, Hansen says he has encountered it. Among Indians of North Vancouver, British Columbia, there are observations made by Baelz as well as by Tenkate (secondhand). In the Mayas of Central America, Starr's (Data on the Ethnography of Western Mexico, Part H., 1902) facts are corroborated by Herman (Aparecimiento de la Mancha Mongolica. Revista de Ethnologia, 1904). He cites A. F. Chamberlain (Pigmentary Spots, American Anthropologist, 1902,) and Starr (Sacral Spots of Mayan Indians, Science, New Series, xvii., 1903).

In Central America, according to these authorities, the spot is called Uits, "pan", and it is an insult to speak of it. It disappears in the tenth month. It is bluish-reddish (in these Native people), and is remarkable by its small size. The mulberry colored spot is very well known in Afro-Brazilians. In Brazil, among individuals of mixed Indigenous American and West African descent (pardo) it is called "genipapo", from its resemblance in color (bluish-gray) to an indigenous fruit of Brazil, named genipapo (a Native American word adopted into Portuguese).

== Prevalence ==
Infants may be born with one or more slate grey nevi ranging from a small area on the buttocks to a larger area on the back. The birthmark is prevalent among East, South, Southeast, North and Central Asian peoples, Indigenous Oceanians (chiefly Micronesians and Polynesians), certain populations in Africa, Amerindians, non-European Latin Americans and Caribbeans of mixed-race descent.

They occur in around 80% of Asians, and 80% to 85% of Native American infants. Approximately 90% of Polynesians and Micronesians are born with slate grey nevi, as are about 46% of children in Latin America, where they are associated with non-European descent. These spots also appear on 5–10% of babies of full Caucasian descent. African American babies have slate grey nevi at a frequencies of 90% to 96%.

According to a 2006 study examining the Mongolian spot among newborns in the Turkish city of İzmir, it was found out that 26% of the examined babies had the condition. It was noted the prevalence rate was 20% and 31% in boys and girls, respectively. The study also reported that no children born with light hair had the mark, meanwhile 47% of the children with dark hair having it.

In a study published in Hungary in 2013 a total of 2289 newborn infants underwent whole-body screening skin examinations. At least one skin manifestation was found in 63% of the neonates. The most frequently observed in pigmented lesions were congenital melanocytic naevi and Mongolian spot.

Since the last century, extensive research has been made regarding the prevalence of said spot in populations of mixed European-native American ancestry. A publication from 1905, citing field research made by the anthropologist Frederick Starr, states that the spot is not present in Mestizo populations; however, Starr's actual research states that "seven Mayan children presented the spot, three mixed children didn't have it"; Starr therefore does not make an absolute judgement, as he does not say how many mixed children were analyzed in total. Nowadays it is completely accepted that the big majority of Mexico's and Latin America's mixed-race populations have the Mongolian spot and that its presence works as an indicator of the actual degree of mestizaje present in a given population, having its lower frequency in Uruguay with 36%, followed by Argentina with an incidence 44%, Mexico with 50%-52%, 68% in Hispanic-Americans and 88% in highland Peruvians.

A study performed in hospitals of Mexico City suggests that socioeconomic factors influence the frequency of Mongolian spots among newborns, as evidenced by the higher prevalence of 85% in newborns from a public institution, typically associated with lower socioeconomic status, compared to a 33% prevalence in newborns from private hospitals, which generally cater to families with higher socioeconomic status. According to the Mexican Social Security Institute nationwide, around half of Mexican babies have the slate grey nevus.

Central American indigenous children were subjected to racism due to their slate grey nevi but progressive circles began to make having the slate grey nevus popular after the late 1960s. Highland Peruvians have the slate grey nevus.

== Treatment ==
As congenital benign nevi, Mongolian spots do not require treatment and in most cases disappear before adolescence. No cases of malignant degeneration have been reported.

== Cultural terminology ==
The slate grey nevus is referred to in the Japanese idiom shiri ga aoi (尻が青い), meaning "to have a blue butt", which is a reference to immaturity or inexperience.

In the Mongolian language, it is known as хөх толбо, meaning "blue spot".

Korean mythology explains the nevus as a bruise formed when Samshin halmi or Samsin Halmoni (Korean: 삼신할머니), a shaman spirit to whom people pray around childbirth, slapped the baby's behind to hasten the baby to quickly get out from the mother's womb. "Mongolian Mark", the middle third of the 2007 novel The Vegetarian, is named after the title character's nevus, which obsesses her brother-in-law.

In Chinese, it is referred to as 青痕 (pinyin: qīng hén, lit. 'blue mark'). Among common folk it is said to be caused by the Buddhist goddess of childbirth Songzi Guanyin (送子观音, pinyin: Sòng Zǐ Guān Yīn; lit. 'the goddess of baby sending') when she is slapping the baby's backside, telling it to be born. Others say it is because the baby does not want to leave the mother's womb, so Songzi Guanyin will kick it out, leaving the bruise. A small portion of people wrongfully believe it is caused when the doctor is slapping the baby's backside to make it cry. Scientifically, it is also referred to as 蒙古斑 (Měng Gǔ Bān; lit. 'Mongolian spot').

In Khmer, it is known as khnau (ខ្នៅ) which translates to 'Mongolian spot' as well as other skin conditions such as vitiligo and leucoderma.

In Spanish it is called mancha mongólica and mancha de Baelz (see Erwin Bälz). The mark is common among Maya people of the Yucatan Peninsula where is referred to as Wa in Maya, which means 'circle'. In Ecuador, the native Indians of Colta are insultingly referred to in Spanish by a number of terms which allude to the slate grey nevus.

In Thai, it is known as Tut Muek (ตูดหมึก) which translates to 'ink bottom', or Ken Kram (เคนคราม), which translates to 'blue strain'. Tut Muek has been used to tease those who act, think or speak like a baby, because this Mongolian spot can be seen only during this period of a human being's life.

In Iñupiaq, is it called auttaq or auktaq, which relates to the word for blood and also means 'mole'.

== See also ==
- Nevus flammeus nuchae, also known as stork bite
- List of cutaneous conditions
