= Vascular malformation =

Blood vessel or lymph vessel abnormality

- Other names: Vascular giantism or Lymphangioma
- Specialty: Cardiovascular
- Treatment: In low-flow lesions, sclerotherapy can be extremely effective, either alone, in small lesions, or combined with surgical resection or embolization, in larger lesions.

A vascular malformation is a type of vascular anomaly. They may cause aesthetic problems as they have a growth cycle, and can continue to grow throughout life.

Vascular malformations of the brain include those involving capillaries, and those involving the veins and arteries. Capillary malformations in the brain are known as cerebral cavernous malformations or capillary cavernous malformations. Those involving the mix of vessels are known as cerebral arteriovenous malformations (AVMs or cAVMs). The arteriovenous type is the most common in the brain.

== Types ==
The International Society for the Study of Vascular Anomalies (ISSVA) classification has 5 types of Vascular Malformation.

Types of Vascular Malformations
| Simple | Combined | Of Major Named Vessels | Associated with Other Anomalies |
|---|---|---|---|
| Capillary malformations | Defined as two or more vascular malformations found in one lesion. | Abnormalities in the origin/course/number of major blood vessels that have anatomical names | Syndromes in which vascular malformations are complicated by symptoms other than vascular anomalies |
| Lymphatic malformations | Defined as two or more vascular malformations found in one lesion. | Abnormalities in the origin/course/number of major blood vessels that have anatomical names | Syndromes in which vascular malformations are complicated by symptoms other than vascular anomalies |
| Venous malformations | Defined as two or more vascular malformations found in one lesion. | Abnormalities in the origin/course/number of major blood vessels that have anatomical names | Syndromes in which vascular malformations are complicated by symptoms other than vascular anomalies |
| Arteriovenous malformations* | Defined as two or more vascular malformations found in one lesion. | Abnormalities in the origin/course/number of major blood vessels that have anatomical names | Syndromes in which vascular malformations are complicated by symptoms other than vascular anomalies |
| Arteriovenous fistula* | Defined as two or more vascular malformations found in one lesion. | Abnormalities in the origin/course/number of major blood vessels that have anatomical names | Syndromes in which vascular malformations are complicated by symptoms other than vascular anomalies |

* denotes high-flow malformation

Vascular malformations can also be divided into low-flow and high-flow types. Low-flow malformations involve a single type of blood or lymph vessel, and are known as simple vascular malformations; high-flow malformations involve an artery. There are also malformations that are of mixed-flow involving more than one type of vessel, such as an arteriovenous malformation. Low-flow vascular malformations include capillary malformations, venous malformations, and lymphatic malformations.

=== Simple Types ===
==== Capillary malformation ====
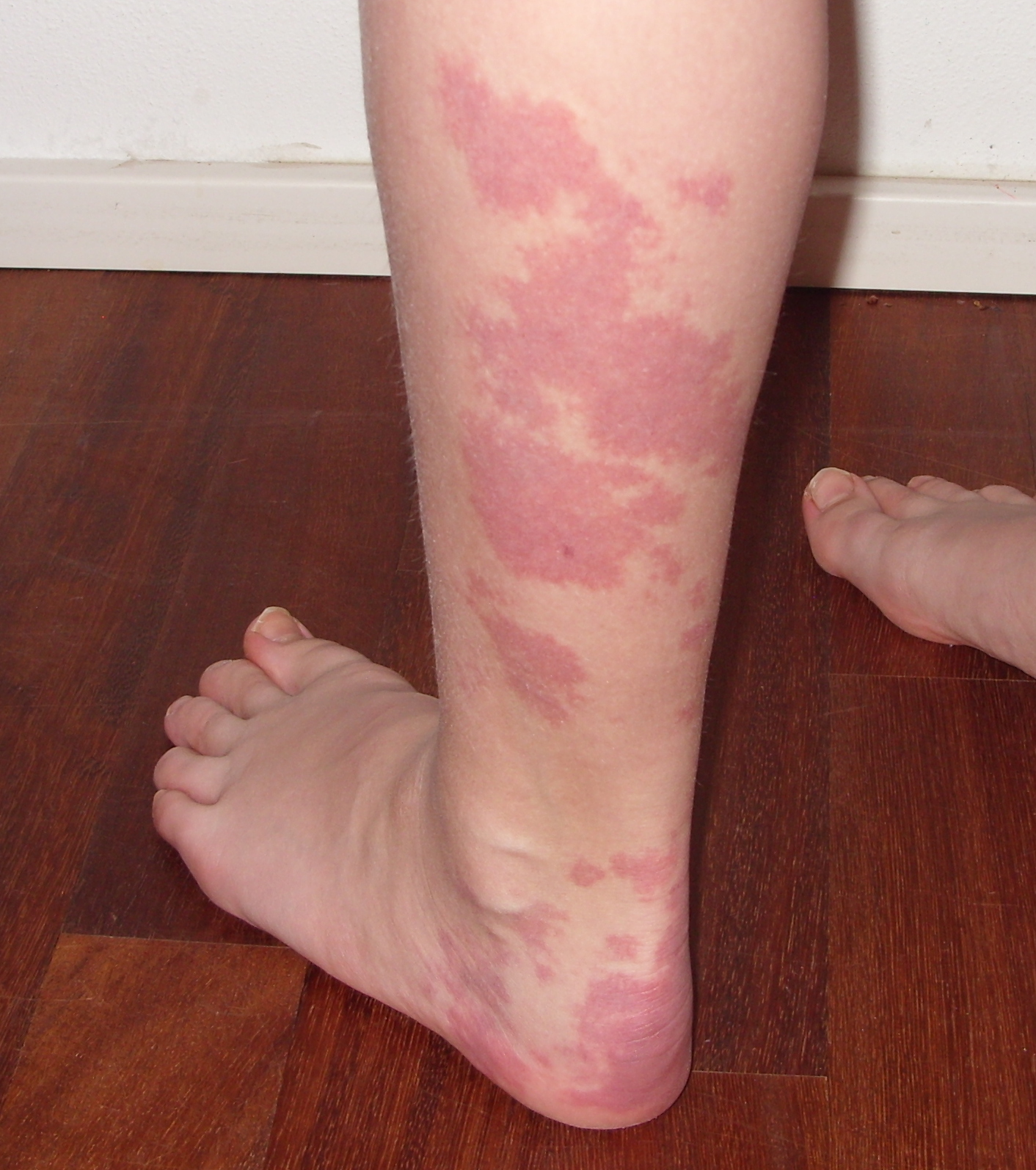
Port-wine stain on leg

Capillary malformations involve the capillaries, and are the most common type. They used to refer only to port-wine stains but now include others. Capillary malformations are limited to the superficial layers of the skin but they can thicken, become nodular, and sometimes become disfiguring. It has been proposed that the category of capillary malformations, also called vascular stains, be classified into seven major clinical types including nevus flammeus nuchae also known as nevus simplex, commonly known as stork bite or salmon patch. Diffuse capillary malformation with overgrowth (DCMO) lesions are benign, diffuse, reticulated pale-colored stains.

A capillary malformation is also a feature of the disorder macrocephaly-capillary malformation. An example of capillary malformation is cerebral cavernous malformations. This disease is linked to the central nervous system (brain, eye, spinal cord). They are abnormal clusters of closely packed, thin-walled blood vessels that usually form caverns. The lesions contain slow-moving or clotted blood. Lesions in the brain and spinal cord are particularly fragile and likely to bleed.

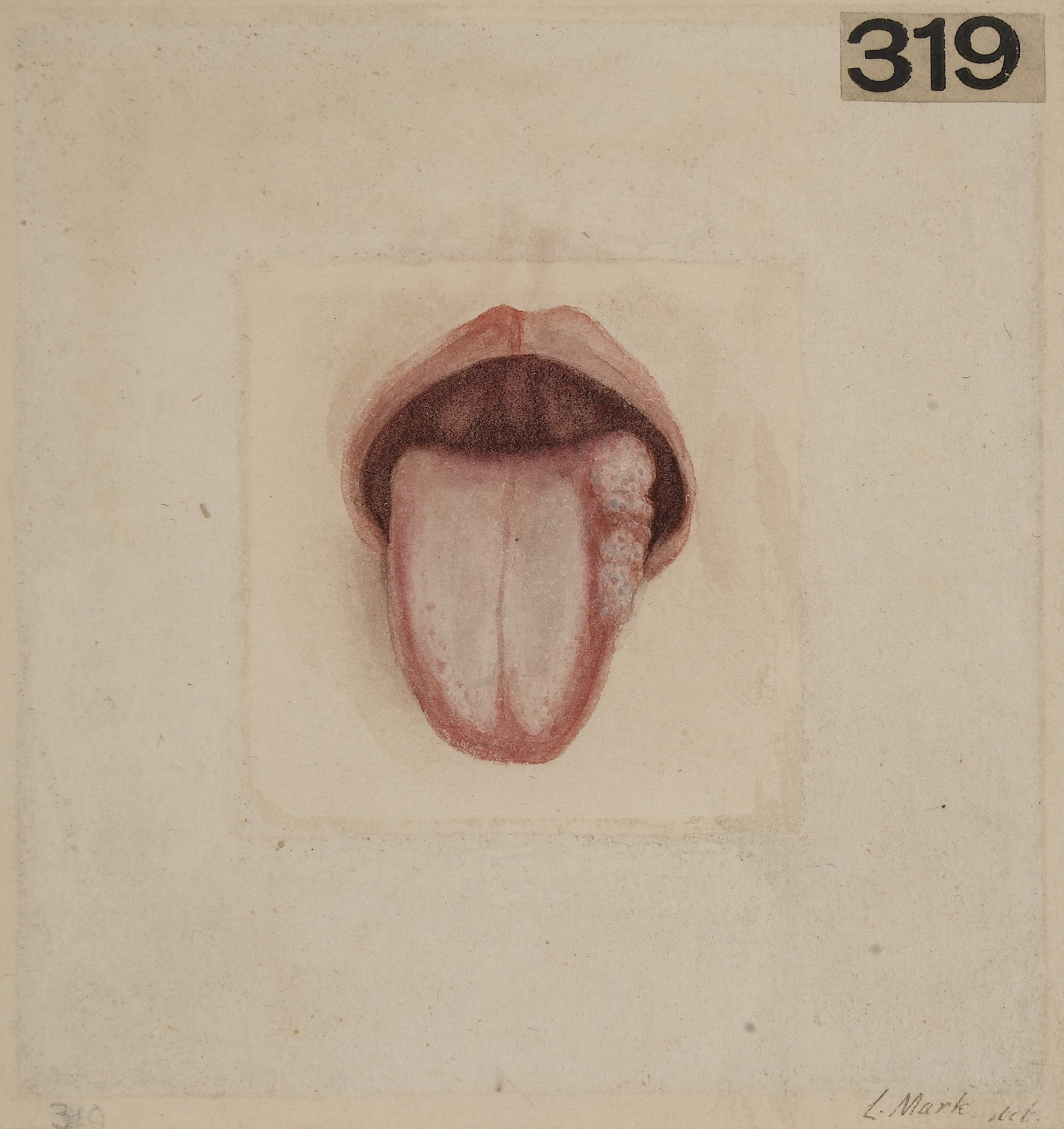
Drawing of a microcystic lymphangioma on the left side of a boy's tongue

==== Lymphatic malformation ====
Lymphatic malformations are congenital, developing from badly-formed lymphatic vessels in early embryonic development. Abnormal development of the lymph vessels results in their failure to connect and drain into the venous system.

These lymph vessels can become blocked due to the collection of lymph which forms a cyst as a mass, and are known as lymphatic malformations. They can be macrocystic, microcystic, or a combination of the two. Macrocystic have cysts greater than 2 cubic centimetres (0.12 cu in), and microcystic lymphatic malformation have cysts that are smaller than 2 cubic centimetres (0.12 cu in).

A severe venous malformation is known as a lymphaticovenous malformation that also involves the lymph vessels.

==== Venous malformations ====
Venous malformations are the type of vascular malformation that involves the veins. They can often extend deeper from their surface appearance, reaching underlying muscle or bone. In the neck they may extend into the lining of the mouth cavity or into the salivary glands. They are the most common of the vascular malformations. A severe venous malformation can involve the lymph vessels as a lymphaticovenous malformation.

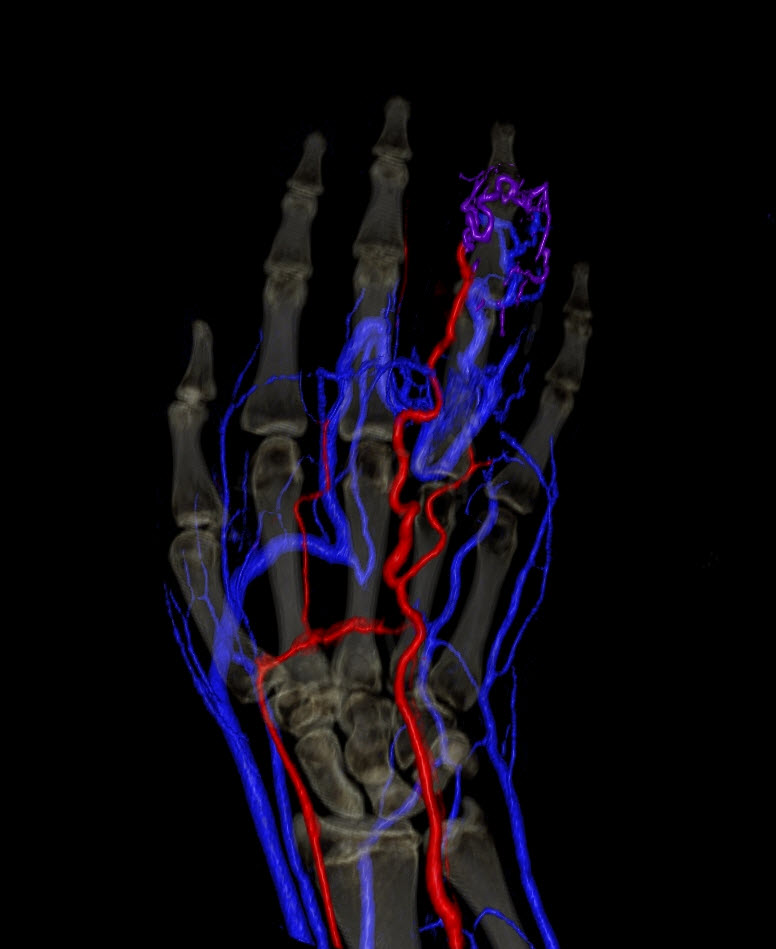
3D image of an arteriovenous malformation shown in purple on the ring finger of a hand

==== Arteriovenous malformation ====
Arteriovenous malformations occur between an artery and a vein.

In the brain a cerebral arteriovenous malformation causes arterial blood to be directly shunted into the veins as there is an absence of a capillary bed. This carries a high risk of an intracranial hemorrhage.

=== Combined Types ===
Combined types are defined as two or more vascular malformations found in one lesion. Examples of combined types include lymphatic-venous malformation (LVM) or capillary-venous-arteriovenous malformation (VAVM).

== Terminology ==
The International Society for the Study of Vascular Anomalies (ISSVA) classification is a basic and systematic classification of vascular anomalies with international acceptance. As such terms such as "Lymphangioma" and "Cystic Hygroma", which were used widely in the past, are outdated. Newer research may only reference ISSVA terminology and, as a consequence, sources of information can be missed by doctors and patients unaware of the ISSVA convention.

Terminology
| ISSVA name | Outdated names |
|---|---|
| Lymphatic malformation | Lymphangioma, Cystic hygroma, Lymphangioma circumscriptum, Cavernous lymphangioma, lymphangiomatosis |
| Venous malformation | Caveronous Hemangioma |
| Capillary Malformation | Port-wine strain, Capillary hemangioma |

== See also ==
- Arteriovenous fistula
- Lymphatic malformations
- Lymphohemangioma
- Telangiectasia
- Vascular disease
