= Macrocephaly-capillary malformation =

- Other names: Macrocephaly-cutis marmorata telangiectatica congenita syndrome, Megalencephaly-cutis marmorata telangiectatica congenita syndrome
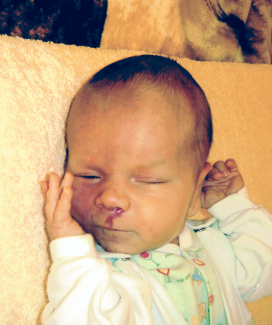
- A newborn child with M-CM syndrome. A port-wine stain is visible under the nose. On the right side of a cheek, capillary malformations are present.

Macrocephaly-capillary malformation (M-CM) is a multiple malformation syndrome causing abnormal body and head overgrowth and cutaneous, vascular, neurologic, and limb abnormalities. Though not every patient has all features, commonly found signs include macrocephaly, congenital macrosomia, extensive cutaneous capillary malformation (naevus flammeus or port-wine stain type birthmark over much of the body; a capillary malformation of the upper lip or philtrum is seen in many patients with this condition), body asymmetry (also called hemihyperplasia or hemihypertrophy), polydactyly or syndactyly of the hands and feet, lax joints, doughy skin, variable developmental delay and other neurologic problems such as seizures and low muscle tone.

== Genetics ==
Mosaic mutations in PIK3CA have been found to be the genetic cause of M-CM. Other overgrowth conditions with distinct phenotypes have also been found to be caused by mosaic mutations in PIK3CA. How different mutations in this gene result in a variety of defined clinical syndromes is still being clarified. Mutations in PIK3CA have not been found in a non-mosaic state in any of these disorders, so it is unlikely that the conditions could be inherited.

== Diagnosis ==
Diagnosis is usually based on clinical observation. Various sets of criteria have been suggested to identify the disorder in an individual patient, all of which include macrocephaly and a number of the following: somatic overgrowth, cutis marmorata, midline facial birthmark, polydactyly/syndactyly, asymmetry (hemihyperplasia or hemihypertrophy), hypotonia at birth, developmental delay, connective tissue defect and frontal bossing. Currently no consensus exists about which diagnostic criteria are definitive and so evaluation by a medical geneticist or other clinician with familiarity with the syndrome is usually needed to provide diagnostic certainty. It is not clear if there are some features which are mandatory to make the diagnosis, but macrocephaly appears essentially universal though may not be congenital. The distinctive vascular abnormalities of the skin often fade over time, making the diagnosis challenging in older children with this condition.

The brain can be affected in several ways in this syndrome. Some children are born with structural brain anomalies such as cortical dysplasia or polymicrogyria. While developmental delay is nearly universal in this syndrome it is variable in severity, with the majority having mild to moderate delays and a minority having severe cognitive impairment. Some patients are affected with a seizure disorder. White matter abnormalities on magnetic resonance imaging (MRI), suggesting a delay in white matter myelination, is commonly seen in early childhood. Some patients may have asymmetry of the brain, with one side being noticeably larger than the other.

One interesting phenomenon that seems very common in this syndrome is the tendency for disproportionate brain growth in the first few years of life, with crossing of percentiles on the head circumference growth charts. A consequence of this disproportionate brain growth appears to be a significantly increased risk of cerebellar tonsillar herniation (descent of the cerebellar tonsils through the foramen magnum of the skull, resembling a Chiari I malformation neuroradiologically) and ventriculomegaly/hydrocephalus. Such cerebellar tonsil herniation may occur in up to 70% of children with M-CM.

The medical literature suggests that there is a risk of cardiac arrhythmias in early childhood. The cause for this is unknown. In addition, a variety of different congenital cardiac malformations have been reported in a small number of patients with this disorder.

Like other syndromes associated with disproportionate growth, there appears to be a slightly increased risk of certain types of childhood malignancies in M-CM (such as Wilms' tumor). However, the precise incidence of these malignancies is unclear.

== Treatment ==
There is no cure for this condition. Treatment is supportive and varies depending on how symptoms present and their severity. Some degree of developmental delay is expected in almost all cases of M-CM, so evaluation for early intervention or special education programs is appropriate. Rare cases have been reported with no discernible delay in academic or school abilities.

Physical therapy and orthopedic bracing can help young children with gross motor development. Occupational therapy or speech therapy may also assist with developmental delays. Attention from an orthopedic surgeon may be required for leg length discrepancy due to hemihyperplasia.

Children with hemihyperplasia are thought to have an elevated risk for certain types of cancers. Recently published management guidelines recommend regular abdominal ultrasounds up to age eight to detect Wilms' tumor. AFP testing to detect liver cancer is not recommended as there have been no reported cases of hepatoblastoma in M-CM patients.

Congenital abnormalities in the brain and progressive brain overgrowth can result in a variety of neurological problems that may require intervention. These include hydrocephalus, cerebellar tonsillar herniation (Chiari I), seizures and syringomyelia. These complications are not usually congenital, they develop over time often presenting complications in late infancy or early childhood, though they can become problems even later. Baseline brain and spinal cord MRI imaging with repeat scans at regular intervals is often prescribed to monitor the changes that result from progressive brain overgrowth.

Assessment of cardiac health with echocardiogram and EKG may be prescribed and arrhythmias or abnormalities may require surgical treatment.

== Prognosis ==
Prognosis varies widely depending on severity of symptoms, degree of intellectual impairment, and associated complications. Because the syndrome is rare and so newly identified, there are no long-term studies.

== History ==
This disorder was recognized as a distinct syndrome in 1997 and named macrocephaly-cutis marmorata telangiectasia congenita or M-CMTC. A new name, macrocephaly-capillary malformation, abbreviated M-CM, was recommended in 2007. This new name was chosen to more accurately describe the skin markings associated with this disorder. In January 2012, a paper proposed new names for the syndrome: megalencephaly-capillary malformation or megalencephaly-capillary malformation-polymicrogyria with an abbreviation of MCAP.
