= Lymphangioma circumscriptum =

- Other names: Superficial lymphatic malformation
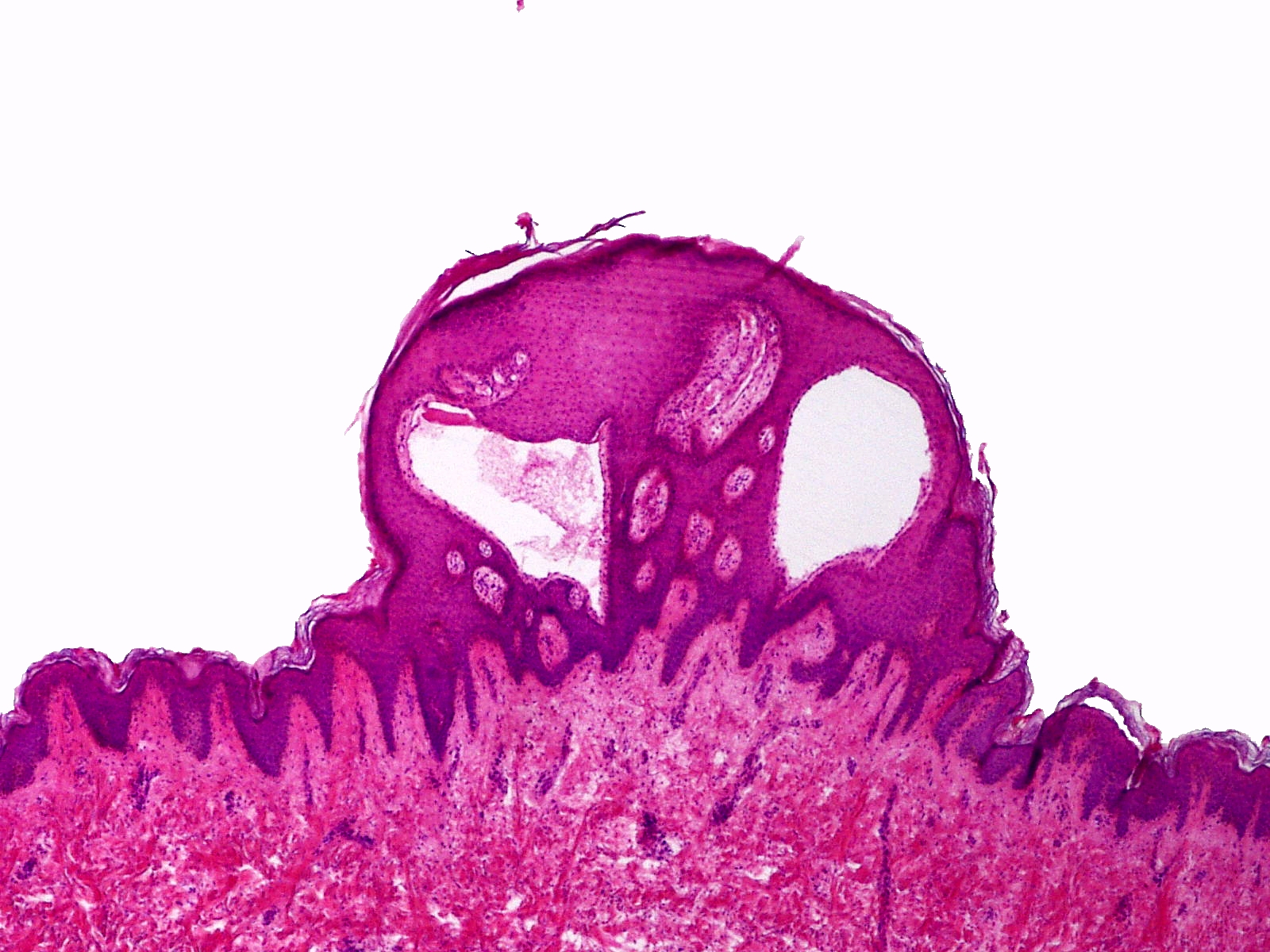
- Lymphangioma circumscriptum; only stratum papillare is affected.
- Specialty: Dermatology
- Symptoms: Vesicular rash, pain, itching, lymph leakage
- Complications: Bleeding, infection
- Usual onset: Congenital
- Causes: Developmental vascular anomaly
- Diagnostic method: Clinical appearance, biopsy, histology
- Differential diagnosis: Herpes simplex, molluscum contagiosum, angiokeratoma
- Treatment: Excision, carbon dioxide laser therapy
- Frequency: Rare

Superficial lymphatic malformation is a congenital vascular anomaly of the superficial lymphatics, presenting as groups of deep-seated, vesicle-like papules resembling frog spawn, at birth or shortly thereafter. Lymphangioma circumscriptum is the most common congenital lymphatic malformation. It is a benign condition, and treatment is not required if the person who has it does not experience symptoms from the condition.

== Signs and symptoms ==
Lymphangioma circumscriptum is characterized by a rash on the skin featuring clear vesicles. The rash may be painful and is sometimes itchy. The vesicles often leak lymph and may bleed. The rash may appear similar to warts if the vesicles frequently break open.

== Diagnosis ==
A biopsy of the affected skin and histological examination under a microscope are necessary to confirm the diagnosis of lymphangioma circumscriptum.

=== Differential diagnosis ===
Several other conditions may mimic lymphangioma circumscriptum. These include infections such as an outbreak of herpes simplex, herpes simplex vegetans, molluscum contagiosum, verruca vulgaris, and condyloma acuminatum. Similarly, benign and cancerous non-infectious conditions may also present in a similar manner, such as angiokeratoma, dermatitis herpetiformis, hemangioma, epidermal nevus, lymphangiectasia, melanoma, angiosarcoma, and metastatic carcinomas.

== Treatment ==
The condition is benign and does not require treatment if the affected person does not have symptoms. Treatment is often pursued for troubling symptoms (itching, pain) or for cosmetic reasons. Surgical removal (excision) of the affected skin layers is the most common and effective treatment. Ablative carbon dioxide laser therapy is a less invasive method that can improve the appearance. This treatment requires local anesthesia and may cause significant wounds. Other treatment options include sclerotherapy and cryotherapy in cases where excision is not feasible.

== See also ==
- Lymphangioma
- Skin lesion
- List of cutaneous conditions
