= Zovegalisib =

Investigational drug

Clinical data
- Other names: RLY-2608

Identifiers
- IUPAC name: N-[(3R)-3-(2-chloro-5-fluorophenyl)-6-(5-cyano-[1,2,4]triazolo[1,5-a]pyridin-6-yl)-1-oxo-2,3-dihydroisoindol-4-yl]-3-fluoro-5-(trifluoromethyl)benzamide
- CAS Number: 2733573-94-7
- PubChem CID: 166822065
- ChemSpider: 129309150
- UNII: LR5XLA3BPC
- ChEMBL: ChEMBL6068523
- PDB ligand: XUZ (PDBe, RCSB PDB)

Chemical and physical data
- Formula: C_{29}H_{14}ClF_{5}N_{6}O_{2}
- Molar mass: 608.91 g·mol^{−1}
- 3D model (JSmol): Interactive image
- SMILES: C1=CC(=C(C=C1F)[C@H]2C3=C(C=C(C=C3NC(=O)C4=CC(=CC(=C4)F)C(F)(F)F)C5=C(N6C(=NC=N6)C=C5)C#N)C(=O)N2)Cl
- InChI: InChI=InChI=1S/C29H14ClF5N6O2/c30-21-3-1-16(31)10-19(21)26-25-20(28(43)40-26)7-13(18-2-4-24-37-12-38-41(24)23(18)11-36)8-22(25)39-27(42)14-5-15(29(33,34)35)9-17(32)6-14/h1-10,12,26H,(H,39,42)(H,40,43)/t26-/m0/s1; Key:VYWRYBZVVSPTQN-SANMLTNESA-N

Zovegalisib is an investigational new drug that is being evaluated by Relay Therapeutics for the treatment of HER2 negative breast cancer. It is a phosphatidylinositol 3 kinase alpha inhibitor.
