= Lymphatic malformations =

Abnormalities of the lymphatic system

Lymphatic Malformation
- Other names: Lymphangioma, Cystic Hygroma
- Lymphatic malformation of the left gluteal region
- Specialty: Vascular surgery, interventional radiology, dermatology, plastic surgery
- Frequency: 0.03%

Lymphatic malformations (LMs) are congenital, benign slow-flow vascular malformations of the lymphatic system characterized by abnormally dilated lymphatic vessels that do not connect properly to the normal lymphatic circulation. These malformations represent developmental anomalies that occur during embryonic lymphatic system formation and are primarily caused by somatic activating mutations in the PIK3CA gene, found in approximately 75-80% of cases.

The umberella term "lymphatic malformation" has replaced older terminology including "lymphangioma," "cystic hygroma," and "lymphangioma circumscriptum." This is because the suffix -ioma imply a relationship to cancer, but these malformations are not cancerous.

== Classification ==
According to the International Society for the Study of Vascular Anomalies (ISSVA), lymphatic malformations are classified as slow-flow vascular malformations (distinguished from vascular tumors which have proliferative endothelial cells) and are divided into three main categories:

=== Isolated Lymphatic Malformations ===
- Macrocystic: Contain cysts greater than 2 cm^{3} in volume
- Microcystic: Contain cysts smaller than 2 cm^{3} in volume
- Mixed Macro-microcystic: Contain both macrocystic and microcystic components
- Angiokeratoma: Small superficial lesions with lymphatic and vascular components

=== Complex Lymphatic Malformations ===
- Generalized Lymphatic Anomaly (GLA): Widespread lymphatic involvement
- Kaposiform Lymphangiomatosis (KLA): Characterized by spindle-shaped lymphatic endothelial cells
- Gorham-Stout Disease (GSD): Progressive bone resorption with lymphatic proliferation
- Central Conducting Lymphatic Anomaly (CCLA): Abnormalities of the central lymphatic system

=== Lymphedemas ===
Primary lymphedema:

- Isolated
- Syndromic (including RASopathy-associated)

Secondary lymphedema:

- Acquired due to damage, obstruction, or removal of lymphatic vessels

== Epidemiology ==
The overall incidence of lymphatic malformations ranges from 1 in 6000 to 1 in 16,000, with no predilection for sex or race. However, precise epidemiological data is difficult to establish due to variations in diagnosis, classification systems, and reporting practices across different healthcare systems. Based on these incidence rates, lymphatic malformations are classified as rare diseases.

While lymphatic malformations can become evident at any age, most are identified at birth or in early childhood, though some may not be noticed until the teenage years or early adulthood if small or located inside the body. Approximately 75% occur in the lymphatic-rich head and neck region, though they can affect any part of the body including the axilla, mediastinum, buttock, pelvis, and other locations.

== Causes ==
=== PIK3CA Mutations ===
Somatic activating mutations in the PIK3CA gene are found in approximately 75-80% of lymphatic malformations. These are non-inherited mutations that occur specifically in lymphatic endothelial cells during embryonic development.

The PIK3CA gene encodes a subunit of phosphatidylinositol 3-kinase (PI3K), which regulates cell growth through the PI3K/mTOR pathway. Activating mutations lead to abnormal cell proliferation and lymphatic vessel development. The mutations are specifically localized to the lymphatic endothelial cells lining the malformed vessels, not to surrounding tissues.

=== Syndromic Associations ===
Lymphatic malformations may also occur as part of genetic syndromes, including:

- Noonan syndrome
- Turner syndrome
- Down syndrome (trisomy 21)
- Trisomies 13 and 18

== Clinical Presentation ==
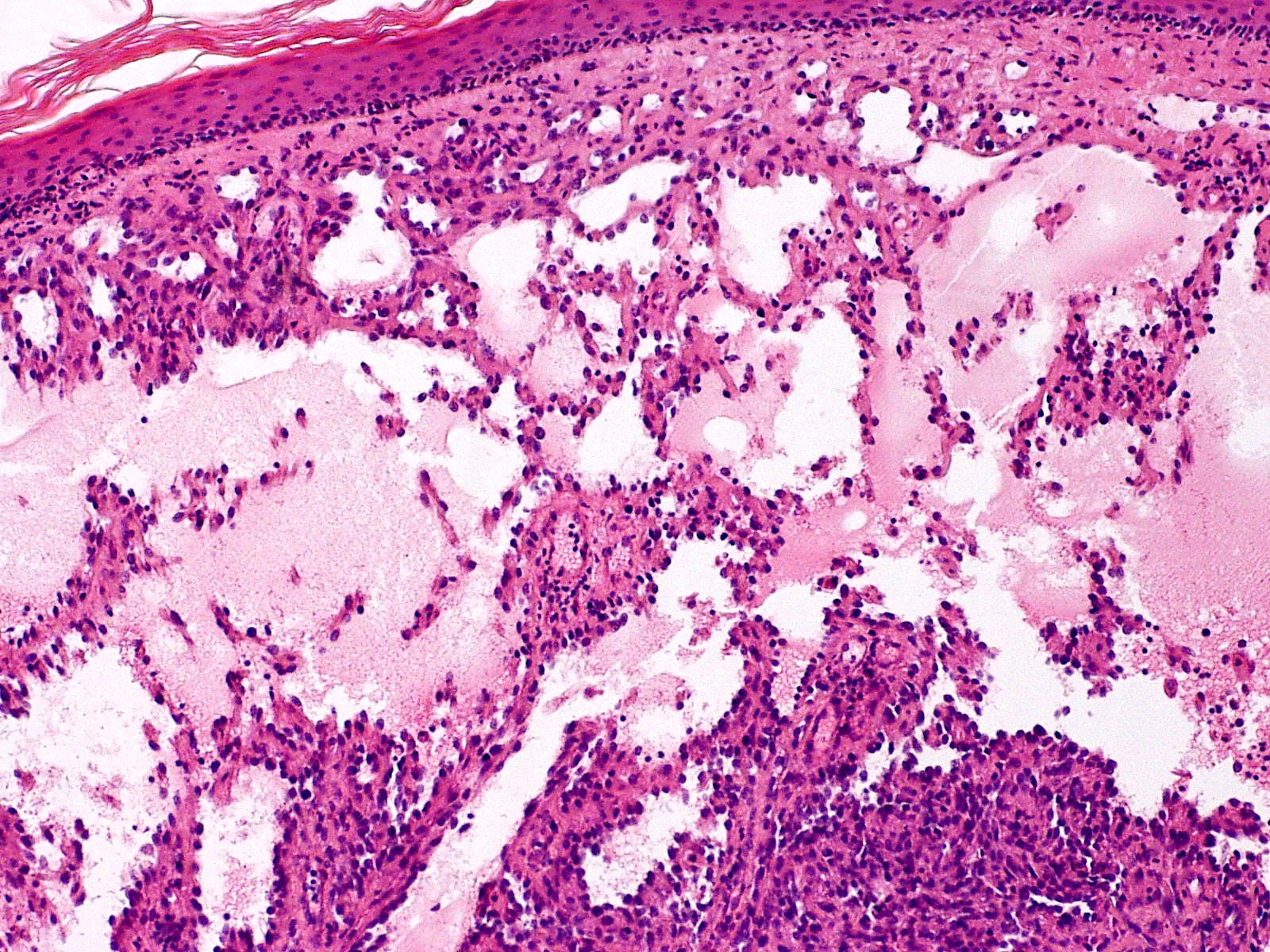
H&E stain

Lymphatic malformations typically present as soft, compressible masses that can vary significantly in size and location. The clinical presentation depends on the type and location:

Microcystic lymphatic malformations (formerly lymphangioma circumscriptum):

- Appear as clusters of small, translucent vesicles on the skin surface
- Range in color from pink to dark red
- May leak clear lymphatic fluid or occasionally bleed when ruptured

Macrocystic lymphatic malformations (formerly cystic hygroma):

- Present as larger, deeper masses with a soft, doughy consistency
- Commonly occur in the neck (75%), axilla, or groin
- Can cause compression symptoms if large
- May fluctuate in size

Mixed malformations:

- Display characteristics of both microcystic and macrocystic types
- Can be more complex and challenging to treat

=== Complications ===
While lymphatic malformations are benign (non-cancerous), they can cause significant symptoms and complications that substantially impact quality of life:

- Recurrent infections: Cellulitis and lymphangitis can cause severe pain, swelling, and systemic illness. These infections may be recurrent and difficult to treat, requiring frequent hospitalizations and long-term antibiotic therapy.
- Chronic pain and discomfort: Ongoing pain from tissue distension, pressure effects, and recurrent infections.
- Functional impairment: Depending on location and size, malformations can interfere with movement, eating, speaking, or other essential functions.
- Psychological and social impact: Visible malformations can affect self-esteem, social interactions, and mental health.
- Bleeding: Trauma to superficial vessels can cause bleeding.
- Compression effects: Large malformations can compress vital structures, causing respiratory distress, swallowing difficulties, or neurological symptoms.
- Lymph leakage: Chronic drainage can lead to skin breakdown, secondary infections, and social difficulties.
- Overgrowth: Progressive enlargement of affected tissues and bones can cause asymmetry and functional problems.

== Treatment ==
Treatment approach depends on the size, location, severity of symptoms, and impact on quality of life and function. The goal is not merely cosmetic improvement, but comprehensive management of symptoms, prevention of complications, and optimization of quality of life. Treatment decisions should involve multidisciplinary teams familiar with vascular anomalies, as these conditions are often poorly understood by general medical practitioners.

=== Surgical Management ===
Complete surgical excision remains the treatment of choice when feasible, offering the best chance for a cure. However, complete removal may not be possible without sacrificing important structures, particularly for extensive microcystic malformations.

=== Sclerotherapy ===
Sclerotherapy has become a primary treatment modality, particularly for macrocystic malformations. Sclerosing agents work by damaging the endothelial lining of the abnormal lymphatic vessels - various agents can be used:

- Doxycycline
- Bleomycin
- Sodium tetradecyl sulfate
- Ethanol

=== Pharmacological treatment ===
Drug therapies for lymphatic malformations aim to reduce abnormal tissue growth by targeting molecular signalling pathways involved in the development and proliferation of lymphatic vessels. Some medications used to treat lymphatic malformations were originally developed for other conditions including cancer before being investigated for vascular anomalies because of their effects on these same signalling pathways. Others, such as sirolimus, were developed for different medical purposes and subsequently found to have potential applications in treating vascular anomalies.

Sirolimus (rapamycin): An inhibitor of the mechanistic target of rapamycin (mTOR), a protein involved in regulating cell growth, proliferation and metabolism. Sirolimus inhibits signalling downstream of the PI3K/AKT/mTOR pathway, reducing cellular proliferation. It has been used to treat complex lymphatic malformations, particularly microcystic lesions, and may help reduce lesion size, lymphatic leakage, bleeding and pain. However, its use requires monitoring because of potential adverse effects, including immunosuppression, mouth ulcers, elevated blood lipids and changes in blood cell counts.

Alpelisib (Piqray or Vijoice): A selective inhibitor of phosphatidylinositol 3-kinase alpha (PI3Kα), the enzyme encoded by the PIK3CA gene. Activating mutations in PIK3CA can cause persistent activation of the PI3K/AKT signalling pathway, resulting in abnormal cell growth and tissue overgrowth. Alpelisib inhibits this overactive signalling, potentially reducing the growth of affected tissues, and has less side effects than sirolimus due to more precise targeting of the overactive gene.

Zovegalisib: An investigational oral inhibitor of PI3Kα designed to selectively target mutant forms of the enzyme while having less activity against its normal, non-mutated form in the rest of the body., therefore causing the least side effects of the three medications listed here. Zovegalisib is currently being evaluated in clinical trials for PIK3CA-related overgrowth spectrum and PIK3CA-driven vascular and lymphatic malformations.

=== Other Treatments ===
- Laser therapy: Pulsed dye laser may be effective for superficial microcystic lesions
- Supportive care: Compression garments, wound care for leaking lesions

== Prognosis ==
The prognosis for lymphatic malformations is generally good, as they are benign lesions with no malignant potential under normal circumstances. Factors affecting prognosis include:

- Location: Head and neck lesions may cause more functional problems
- Size and extent: Larger, more extensive lesions are more challenging to treat
- Type: Macrocystic lesions generally respond better to sclerotherapy
- Associated syndromes: May complicate management and prognosis

Complete cure is possible with total surgical excision, but recurrence can occur if residual tissue remains. Medical therapies like Sirolimus, Alpelisib, and Zovegalisib can provide significant symptom improvement and size reduction but typically require ongoing treatment or are still being researched for use in lymphatic malformations.

== History ==
The understanding and classification of lymphatic malformations has evolved significantly:

- 1828: Redenbacher first described lymphangioma lesions.
- 1843: Wernher described the condition in his 1843 publication, Die angeborenen Kysten-hygrome und die ihnen verwandten Geschwülste (Congenital cystic hygromas and related tumors).
- 1965: Bill and Summer proposed that cystic hygromas and lymphangiomas represent variations of a single entity.
- 1976: Whimster studied the pathogenesis of lymphangioma circumscriptum, providing insights into the developmental basis.
- 2014-2015: Discovery of PIK3CA mutations as the primary cause of lymphatic malformations, revolutionizing understanding of pathogenesis.
- 2018: ISSVA classification update standardizing terminology to "lymphatic malformation".
