= Birthmark =

Benign skin irregularity which appears near the time of birth

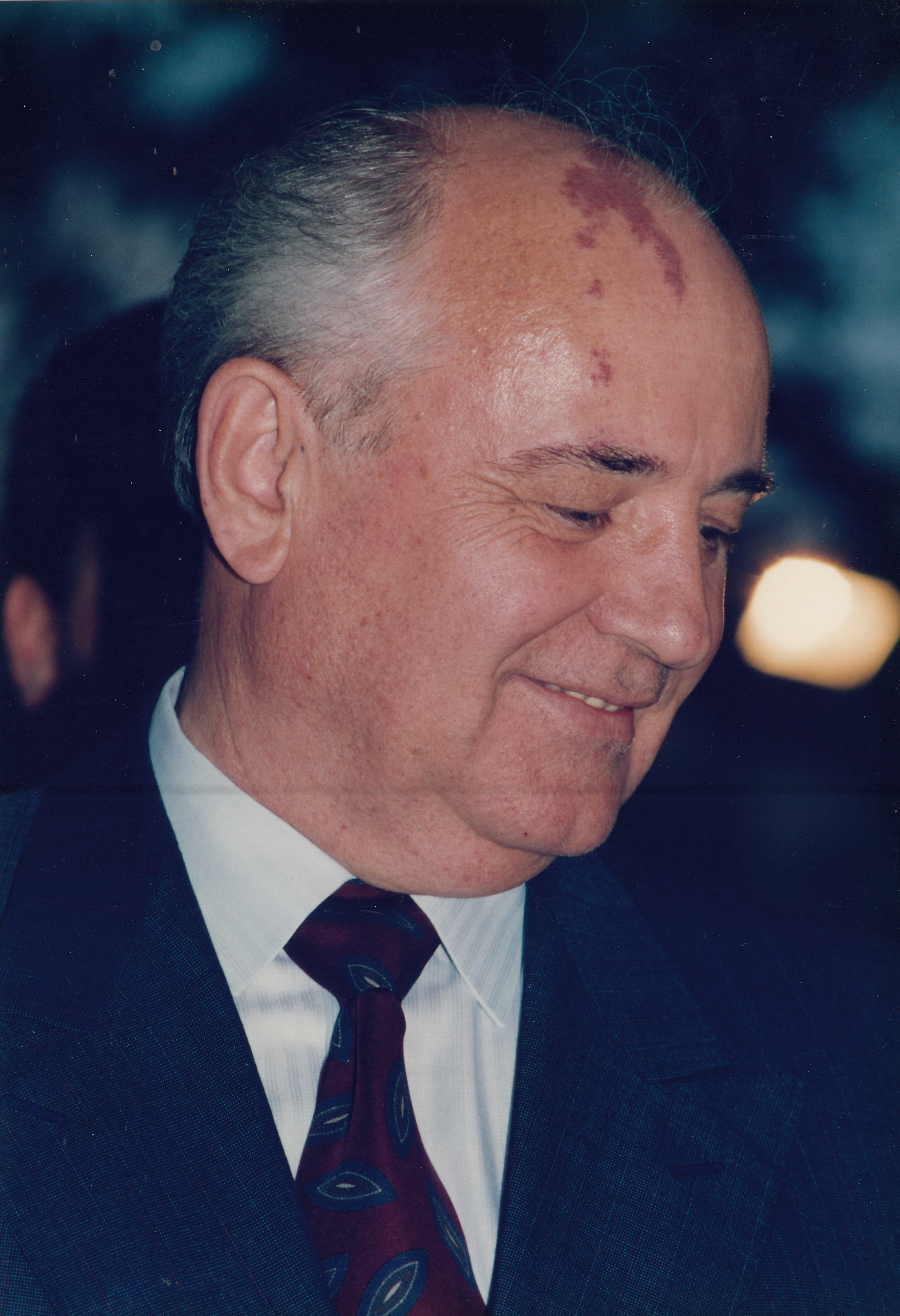
- Port-wine stain birthmark visible on the head of Mikhail Gorbachev, one of the most famous individuals with such a birthmark
- Specialty: Dermatology

A birthmark is a congenital, benign irregularity on the skin which is present at birth or appears shortly after birth—usually in the first month. Birthmarks can occur anywhere on the skin. They are caused by overgrowth of blood vessels, melanocytes, smooth muscle, fat, fibroblasts, or keratinocytes.

Dermatologists divide birthmarks into two types: pigmented birthmarks and vascular birthmarks. Pigmented birthmarks caused by excess skin pigment cells include: moles, café au lait spots, and Mongolian spots. Vascular birthmarks, also called red birthmarks, are caused by increased blood vessels and include macular stains (salmon patches), hemangiomas, and port-wine stains. A little over 1 in 10 babies have a vascular birthmark present by age 1. Several birthmark types are part of the group of skin lesions known as nevi or naevi, which is Latin for "birthmarks".

Birthmarks occur as a result of a localized imbalance in factors controlling the development and migration of skin cells. In addition, it is known that most vascular birthmarks are not hereditary.

== Pigmented types ==
=== Mole ===
Congenital melanocytic nevus is a type of melanocytic nevus, the medical term for what is colloquially called a "mole", found in infants at birth. Occurring in about 1% of infants in the United States, it is located in the area of the head and neck 15% of the time, but may occur anywhere on the body. It may appear as light brown in fair-skinned people, to almost black in people with darker skin. Coming in a variety of sizes and appearances, they may be irregular in shape and flat, or raised and lumpy in appearance and feel. Such naevi can also manifest themselves as beauty marks, which most commonly appear on the face, neck or arms.

=== Café au lait spot ===
Café au lait spot macules may occur anywhere on the body. They are most commonly oval in shape and light brown, or milk coffee, in color. These birthmarks may be present at birth, or appear in early childhood, and do not fade much with age. One or two on an individual is common; however, four or more may be an indicator of neurofibromatosis. In the event of weight gain, the birthmark can stretch with the skin and become larger.

=== Mongolian spot ===
A Mongolian blue spot (dermal melanocytosis) is a benign flat congenital birthmark with wavy borders and irregular shape, most common among East Asians and Turkic people (excluding Turks of Asia Minor), and named after Mongolians. It is also extremely prevalent among East Africans and Native Americans. It normally disappears three to five years after birth and almost always by puberty. The most common color is blue, although they can be blue-gray, blue-black or even deep brown.

The Mongolian spot is a congenital developmental condition exclusively involving the skin. The blue colour is caused by melanocytes, melanin-containing cells, that are deep under the skin. Usually, as multiple spots or one large patch, it covers one or more of the lumbosacral area (lower back), the buttocks, sides, and shoulders. It results from the entrapment of melanocytes in the dermis during their migration from the neural crest to the epidermis during embryonic development.

Among those who are not aware of the background of the Mongolian spots, it may sometimes be mistaken for a bruise indicative of child abuse.

== Vascular types ==
=== Stork bite ===
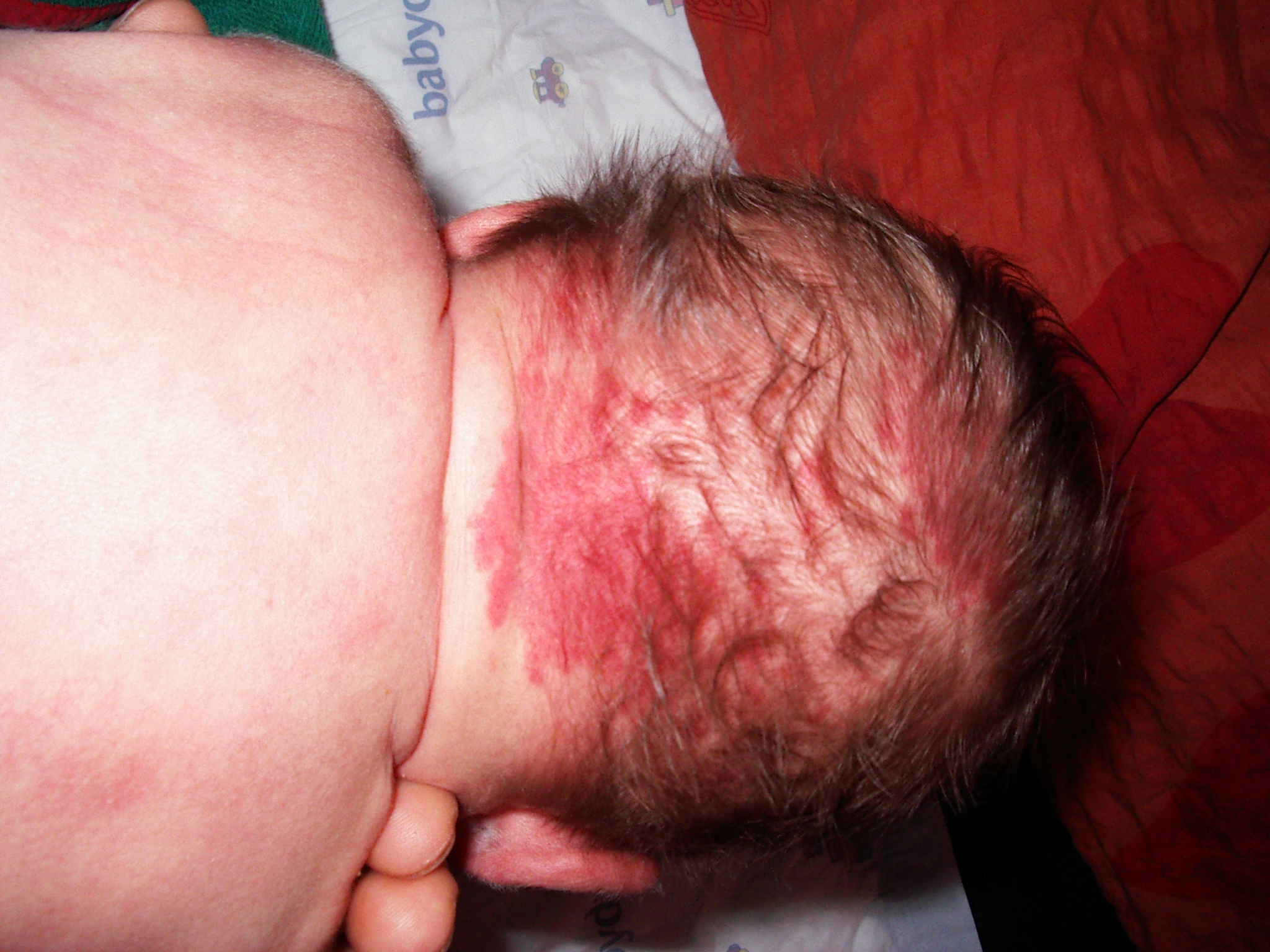
Stork bite

Colloquially called a "stork bite", "angel's kiss" or "salmon patch", telangiectatic nevus appears as a pink or tanned, flat, irregularly shaped mark on the knee, back of the neck, and/or the forehead, eyelids and, sometimes, the top lip. The skin is not thickened and feels no different from anywhere else on the body; the only difference is in appearance. Nearly half of all babies have such a birthmark.

=== Strawberry mark ===
An infantile hemangioma, colloquially called a strawberry mark, is a benign self-involuting tumor (swelling or growth) of endothelial cells, the cells that line blood vessels. It usually appears during the first weeks of life and resolves by age 10. It is the most common tumor of infancy.

PHACES Syndrome, a rare condition that often involves brain, heart, and arterial abnormalities, is generally accompanied by the presence of large facial hemangiomas. In such cases, what appears to be a small bruise or birthmark may grow rapidly and take on a puffy appearance in the first days or weeks of life.

=== Port-wine stain ===
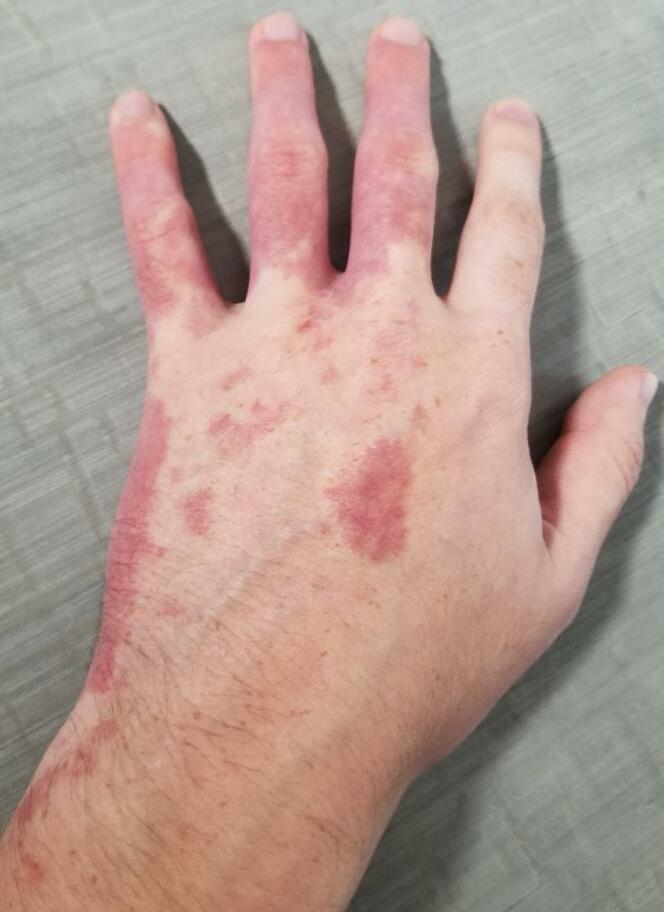
The back of a hand with prominent port-wine staining

Port-wine stains, also known as nevus flammeus and sometimes mistaken for strawberry marks, are present at birth and range from a pale pink in color, to a deep wine-red. Irregular in appearance, they are usually quite large, and caused by a deficiency or absence in the nerve supply to blood vessels. This causes vasodilation, the dilation of blood vessels, causing blood to pool or collect in the affected area. Over time, port-wine stains may become thick or develop small ridges or bumps, and do not fade with age. Such birthmarks may have emotional or social repercussions. Port-wine stains occur in 0.3% of the population, equally among males and females. They frequently express unilaterally, i.e., on only one side, not crossing the midline of the body. Often on the face, marks on the upper eyelid or forehead may be indicative of a condition called Sturge–Weber syndrome. Additionally, port-wine stains in these locations may be associated with glaucoma and seizures.

== Treatment ==
Most birthmarks are harmless and do not require treatment. Pigmented marks can resolve on their own over time in some cases. Vascular birthmarks may require reduction or removal for cosmetic reasons. Treatments include administering oral or injected steroids, dermatological lasers to reduce size and/or color, or dermatologic surgery.

== Historical explanations ==
Many explanations were given to explain the origin of birthmarks. Occasionally, it was said that children could be 'marked' or 'imprinted' upon by scares or frights given to the mother during the pregnancy, which draws on the outdated theory of maternal impression:

Children are also said to be marked by some sudden fright or unpleasant experience of the mother, and I have myself seen a pop-eyed, big-mouthed idiot whose condition is ascribed to the fact that his mother stepped on a toad several months before his birth. In another case, a large red mark on a baby's cheek was caused by the mother seeing a man shot down at her side, when the discharge of the gun threw some of the blood and brains into her face.

Other explanations claimed that birthmarks shaped like food were the direct result of the mother's pregnancy cravings, or the mother touching a certain part of her body during a solar eclipse – her child's birthmark will be in the same location.
