= Port-wine stain =

Vascular anomaly

- Other names: Nevus flammeus, Firemark
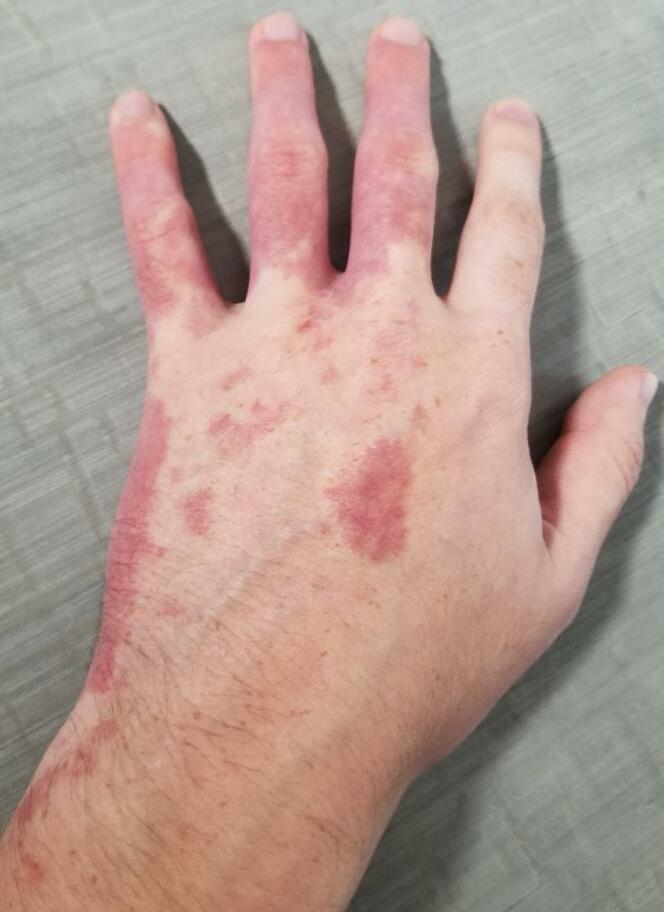
- The back of a hand with prominent port-wine staining
- Specialty: Medical genetics

A port-wine stain (nevus flammeus) is a discoloration of the human skin caused by a vascular anomaly (a capillary malformation in the skin). They are so named for their coloration, which is similar in color to port wine, a fortified red wine from Portugal.

A port-wine stain is a capillary malformation, seen at birth. Port-wine stains persist throughout life. The area of skin affected grows in proportion to general growth.

Port-wine stains occur most often on the face but can appear anywhere on the body, particularly on the neck, upper trunk, arms and legs. Early stains are usually flat and pink in appearance. As the child matures, the color may deepen to a dark red or purplish color. In adulthood, thickening of the lesion or the development of small lumps may occur.

Port-wine stains may be part of a syndrome such as Sturge–Weber syndrome or Klippel–Trénaunay–Weber syndrome.

== Types ==
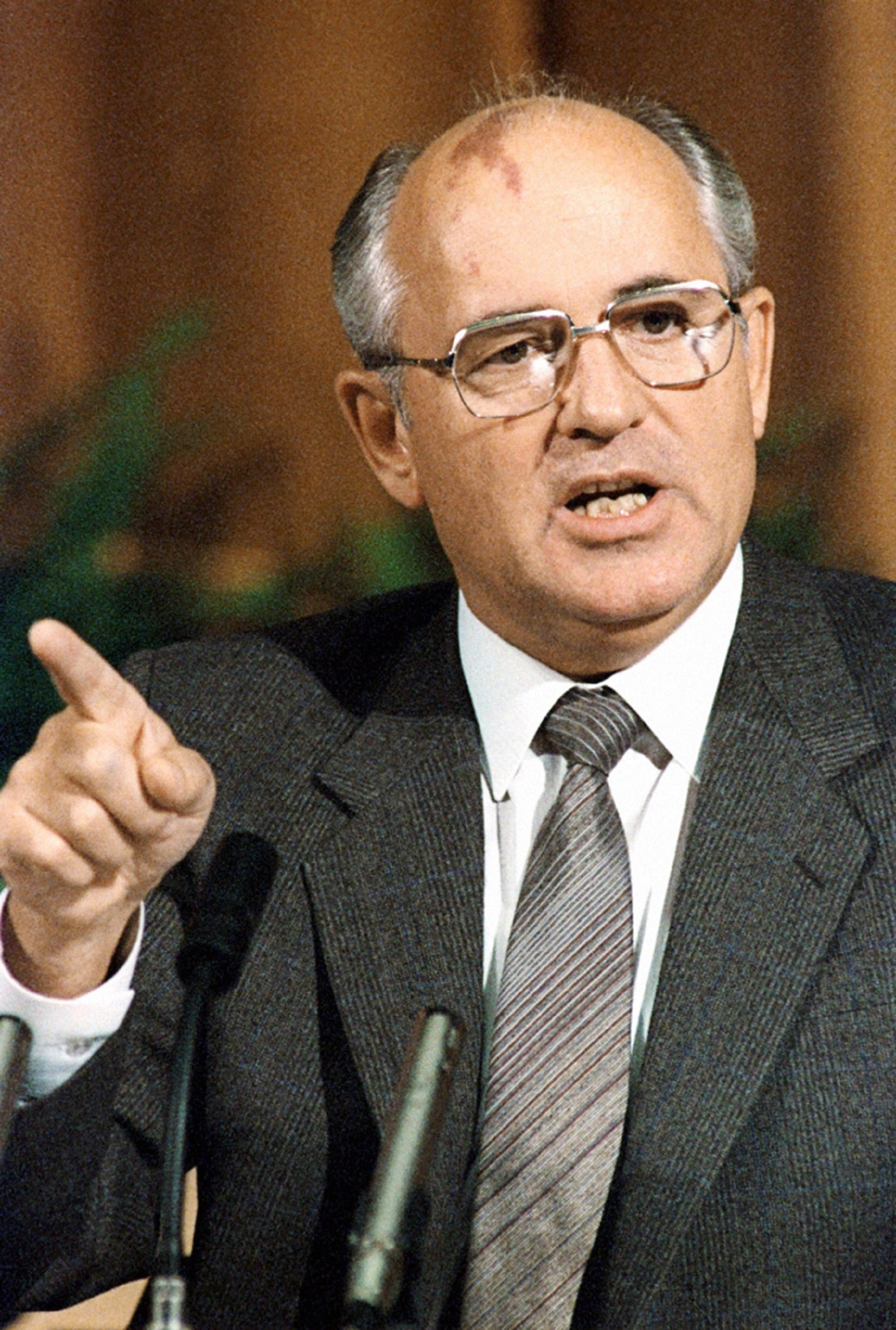
Mikhail Gorbachev, last leader of the Soviet Union, with a prominent port-wine stain on his forehead

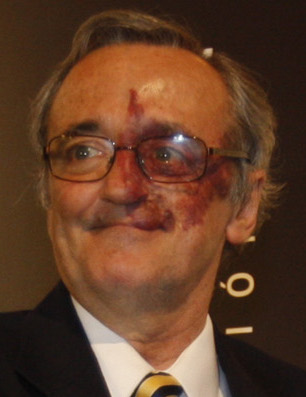
Cancer researcher Mariano Barbacid

Nevus flammeus may be divided as follows:

- Nevus flammeus nuchae
- Midline nevus flammeus - also known as salmon patch and angel's kiss, is a vascular birthmark which may be found on the glabellar region or on one upper eyelid, and presents in approximately 15% of newborns.

== Genetics ==
Port-wine stains were shown to be caused by a somatic activating c.548G→A mutation in the GNAQ gene. An association with RASA1 has also been described.

== Diagnosis ==
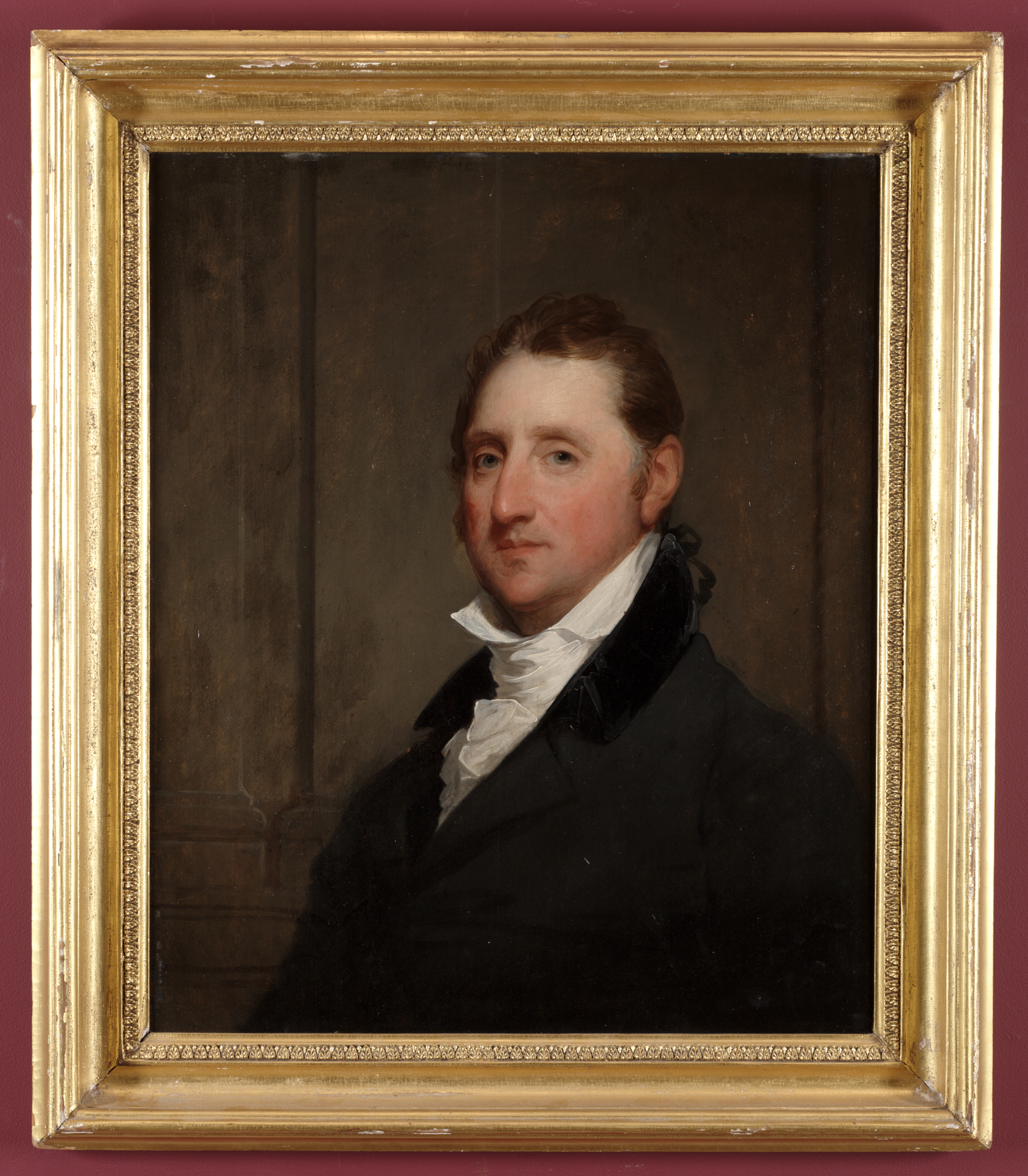
Thomas Handasyd Perkins, American slaver and merchant with a prominent port-wine stain on his cheek

A healthcare provider can usually diagnose a port-wine stain based entirely upon the history and appearance. In unusual cases, a skin biopsy may be needed to confirm the diagnosis. Depending on the location of the birthmark and other associated symptoms, a physician may choose to order a measurement of intraocular pressure or X-ray of the skull.

An MRI of the brain may be performed (under anesthesia) on infants who have a port-wine stain in the head area in order to check for signs of Sturge–Weber syndrome.

If the port-wine stain is inside the mouth, a provider may check the insides of a newborn baby's throat with a scope to see if there are any changes (growths) other than just the color.

If the port-wine stain is around the eye or on the eyelid, a referral may be made to an optometrist or ophthalmologist for a test of the ocular pressures in that eye. If swelling occurs in the port-wine stain, it may cause vision problems, glaucoma, or blindness.

== Treatment ==
Many treatments have been tried for port-wine stains including freezing, surgery, radiation, and tattooing; port-wine stains can also be covered with cosmetics.

Lasers may be able to destroy the capillaries without significant damage to the overlying skin. Lasers and other light sources may therefore be able to reduce the redness of port-wine stains, although there is not enough evidence to recommend one form over another.

For most people in trials of pulsed dye laser, more than 25% of the redness was reduced by laser after one to three treatments. Adverse effects were rare in these trials, although some people had changes to the color of the skin, especially Chinese people with darker skin. There can be pain, crusting, and blistering in the two weeks after treatment. The trials only followed people for six months, so long-term outcomes are not known. Up to 10 treatments may be necessary for improvement, but complete removal may not result. The use of topical rapamycin as an adjunct to pulsed dye laser may improve results.

Treatment is generally given before one year of age.

== Prognosis ==
In the absence of successful treatment, hypertrophy (increased tissue mass) of the stains may cause problems later in life, such as loss of function (especially if the stain is near the eye or mouth), bleeding, and increasing disfigurement. Lesions on or near the eyelid can be associated with glaucoma. If the port-wine stain is on the face or other highly visible part of the body, its presence can also cause emotional and social problems for the affected person.

== Epidemiology ==
Studies have recorded an incidence of about 3–5 cases per 1,000 newborn babies.
