= Hemihypertrophy =

Overgrowth on one side of the body

- Other names: Hemihyperplasia
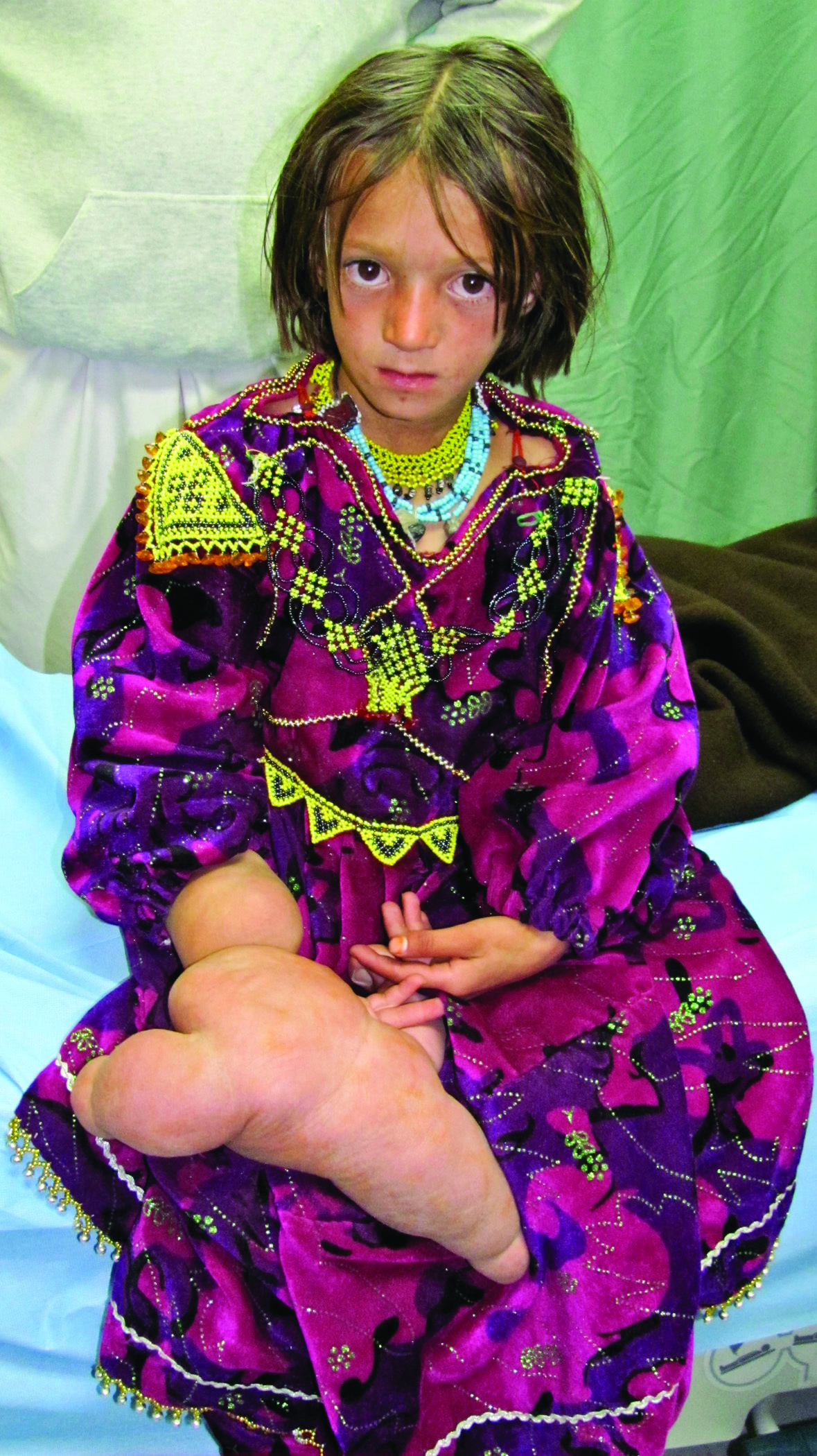
- An 8-year-old Afghani girl with congenital hemihypertrophy of the right arm and hand

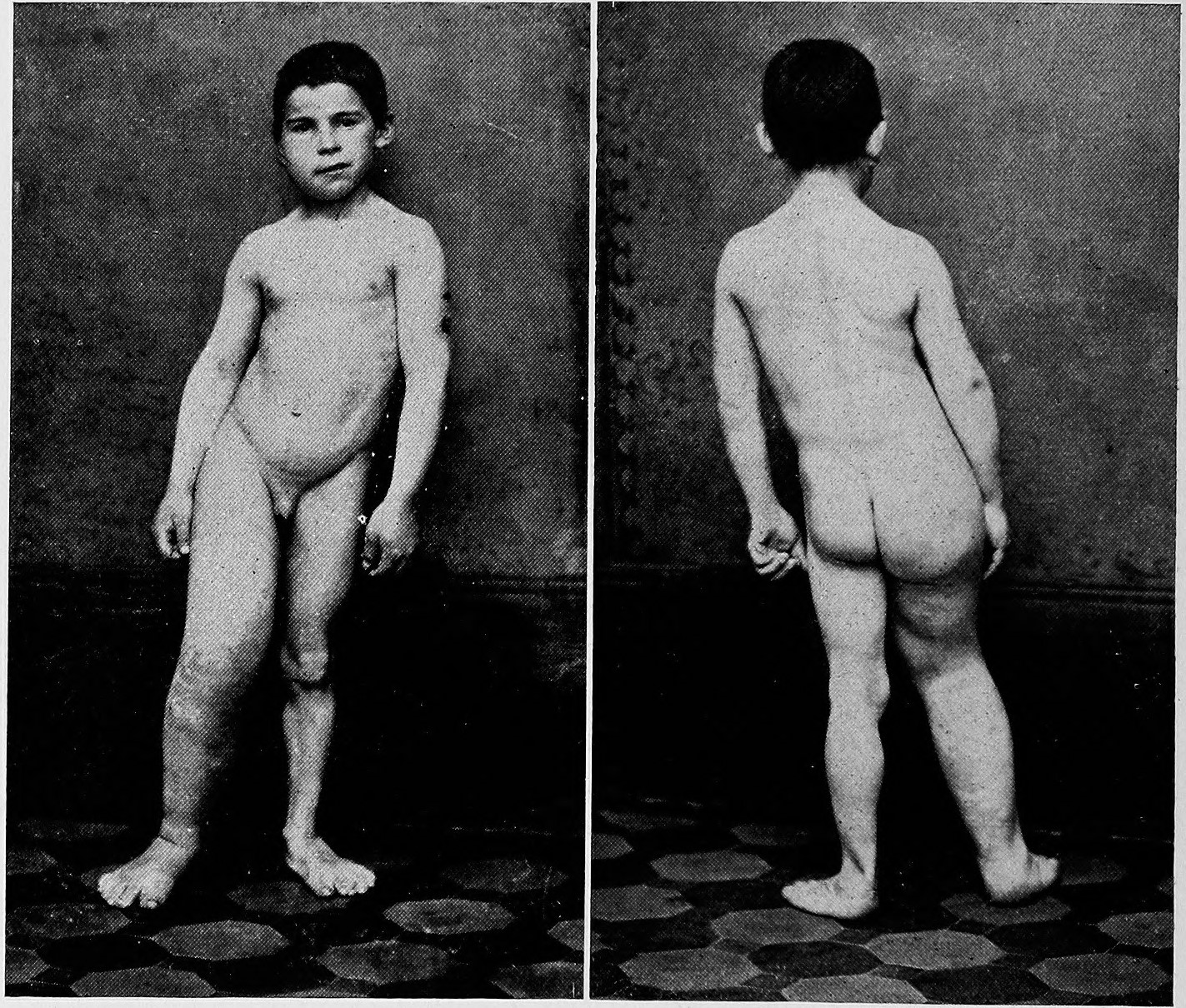
Full-body hemihypertrophy

Hemihypertrophy, now more commonly referred to as hemihyperplasia in the medical literature, is a condition in which one side of the body or a part of one side of the body is larger than the other to an extent considered greater than the normal variation. As establishing a set of clinical criteria for diagnosis of hemihyperplasia is difficult, the dictum is often used that the clinician should be able to see the asymmetry "from the end of the bed".

Hemihyperplasia is seen in several congenital syndromes including Beckwith-Wiedemann syndrome and Russell-Silver syndrome.

Hemihyperplasia is a congenital overgrowth disorder, and the asymmetry can range from mild to severe. Establishing a diagnosis is important because hemihyperplasia is associated with an increased risk for embryonal tumors, mainly Wilms tumor and hepatoblastoma. Due to the heightened tumor risk, a tumor screening protocol is recommended for all children with isolated hemihyperplasia and Beckwith-Wiedemann Syndrome. Some of the other syndromes associated with hemihyperplasia may also follow this tumor-surveillance protocol. The recommended protocol is:

1. Any child with suspected isolated hemihyperplasia should be referred to a clinical geneticist for evaluation.
2. Abdominal ultrasound should be conducted every 3 months until 7 years old.
3. Serum alpha fetoprotein measurement should be done every 3 months until 4 years old.
4. Daily caretaker abdominal examination is at the discretion of the provider/parent.

In some cases, children with hemihyperplasia may have different leg lengths. The two main surgical options for the treatment of uneven leg lengths are shortening and lengthening. Epiphysiodesis, which involves removing part of the growth plate of the longer leg, allowing the shorter leg to "catch up", may be performed on patients still able to grow. Bone resection is performed on patients who have no growth left and involves removing part of the bone. Leg lengthening procedures are more painful, involving the insertion of pins to be turned, moving parts of the bone apart (Ilizarov's method). This process is reserved mainly for patients with a discrepancy greater than 4 centimetres (1.6 in) although some leg lengthening procedures are now done cosmetically. Nonsurgical options include attachment of a lift to the shoe, allowing the patient to walk normally.

Children with hemihypertrophy may also develop scoliosis, a curvature of the spine.

Hemifacial hyperplasia is believed to be a minor form of hemihypertrophy.
