= Fordyce =

Fordyce may refer to:

== People ==
=== Given name ===
- Fordyce L. Laflin (1824–1887), New York businessman and politician
- Fordyce R. Melvin (1832–1915), Wisconsin businessman and politician

=== Surname ===
- Alexander Fordyce (died 1789), Scottish banker
- Brook Fordyce (born 1970), U.S. professional baseball player
- Bruce Fordyce (born 1955), South African long-distance runner
- Daryl Fordyce (born 1987), British footballer
- David Fordyce (1711–1751), Scottish philosopher
- Douglas Fordyce (born 1990), Men's Pairs world championship gold medal-winning acrobatic gymnast, member of Spelbound
- Ewan Fordyce (1953–2023), New Zealand paleontologist
- George Fordyce (1736–1802), Scottish physician
- James Fordyce (1720–1796), Scottish clergyman, compiler and primary author of Fordyce's Sermons
- John Fordyce (priest) (died 1751), Church of England priest ordained in Pembrokeshire, Wales who transferred to South Carolina
- John Fordyce (politician) (1735–1809), Member of Parliament for New Romney and for Berwick-Upon-Tweed
- John Fordyce (missionary) (1819–1902), Scottish missionary
- John Addison Fordyce (1858–1925), American dermatologist
- Michael W. Fordyce (1944–2011), American happiness researcher
- Samuel W. Fordyce (1840–1919), U.S. railroad executive
- Tom Fordyce (born 1973), British journalist
- Sir William Fordyce (1724–1792), Scottish physician
- William Dingwall Fordyce (1836–1875), Scottish Liberal politician

== Places ==
- Fordyce, Arkansas, USA
- Fordyce, Nebraska, USA
- Fordyce, Aberdeenshire, Scotland
- Fordyce Creek Trail, California, USA

== Other ==
- Fordyce's spot
- Fox–Fordyce disease
