= Pimple =

Type of comedo

- Other names: Zit, spot
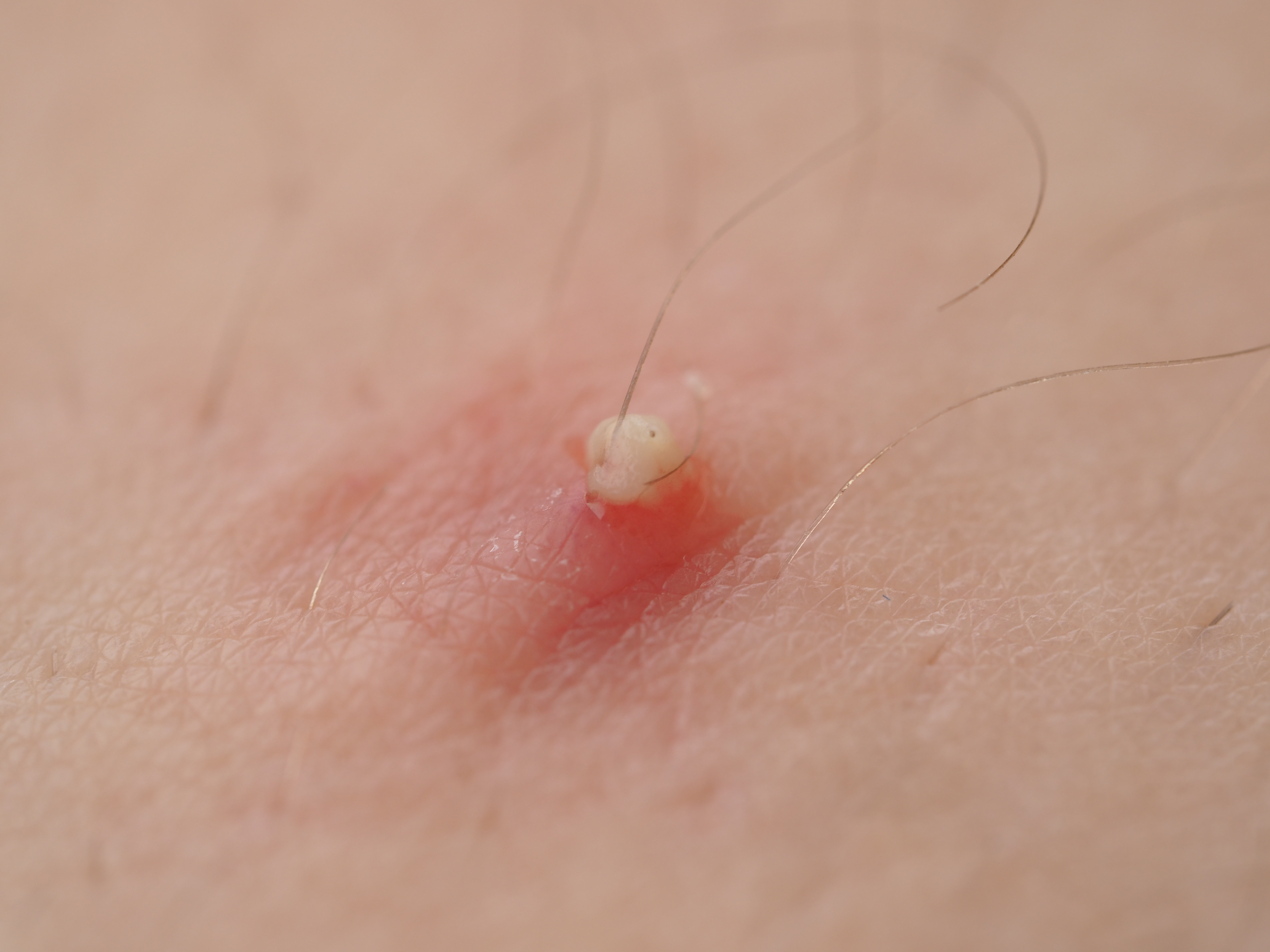
- A pimple evolved into the pustule stage
- Specialty: Dermatology

A pimple or zit is a kind of comedo that results from excess sebum and dead skin cells getting trapped in the pores of the skin. In its aggravated state, it may evolve into a pustule or papule. Pimples can be treated by acne medications, antibiotics, and anti-inflammatories prescribed by a physician, or various over the counter remedies purchased at a pharmacy.

== Causes ==
Sebaceous glands inside the pore of the skin produce sebum. When the outer layers of skin shed (a natural and continuous process, normally), dead skin and oily sebum left behind may bond together and form a blockage of the sebaceous gland at the base of the skin. This is most common when the skin becomes thicker at puberty. The sebaceous gland continues to produce sebum, which builds up behind the blockage, allowing bacteria to grow in the area, including the species Staphylococcus aureus and Cutibacterium acnes, which causes inflammation and infection. Other causes of pimples include family history, stress, fluctuations in hormone levels, hair and skincare products, medication side effects, and un-diagnosed or underlying medical conditions. Pimples can be part of the presentation of rosacea.

The American Academy of Dermatology recommends that adults with acne use products labeled as "non-comedogenic", "non-acnegenic", "oil-free" or "won’t clog pores", as they are "least likely" to cause skin irritation or acne.

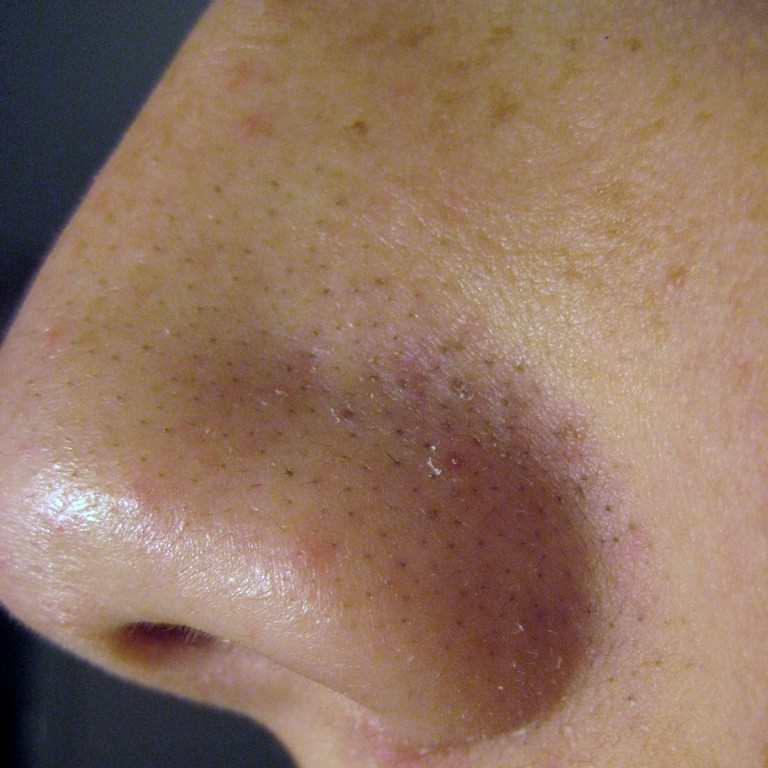
Sebaceous filaments are commonly mistaken for blackheads. However, they are completely harmless and are a natural part of the skin for people with oily skin.

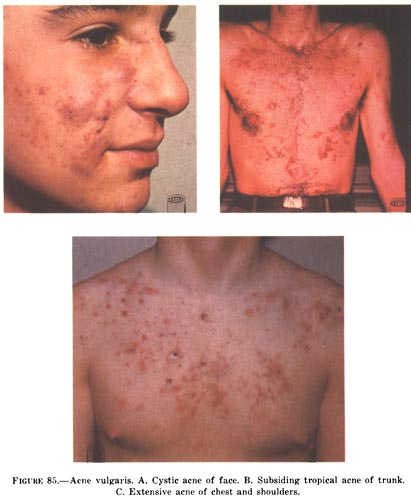
Some more severe pimples can lead to significant swelling and may appear on the back and chest.

== Treatment ==
=== Over-the-counter medications ===
Common over-the-counter medications for pimples are benzoyl peroxide, salicylic acid, adapalene, and antibacterial agents such as triclosan. These topical medications, which can be found in many creams and gels used to treat acne (acne vulgaris), induce skin to slough off more easily, helping to remove bacteria faster. Before application, the face should be washed with warm water or a topical cleanser and then dried.

A regimen of keeping the affected skin area clean, plus the regular application of these topical medications is usually enough to keep acne under control, if not at bay altogether. The most common product is a topical treatment of benzoyl peroxide, which has minimal risk apart from minor skin irritation that may present similar as a mild allergy. Recently, nicotinamide (vitamin B_{3}), applied topically, has been shown to be more effective in treatment of pimples than antibiotics such as clindamycin. Nicotinamide is not an antibiotic and has no side effects typically associated with antibiotics. It has the added advantage of reducing skin hyperpigmentation which results in pimple scars.

=== Prescription medication ===
Severe acne usually indicates the necessity of prescription medication to treat the pimples. Prescription medications used to treat acne and pimples include isotretinoin, which is a retinoid, anti-seborrheic medications, anti-androgen medications, hormonal treatments, alpha hydroxy acid, azelaic acid, and keratolytic soaps.

Historically, antibiotics such as tetracyclines and erythromycin were prescribed. While they were more effective than topical applications of benzoyl peroxide, the bacteria eventually grew resistant to the antibiotics and the treatments became less and less effective. Also, antibiotics had more side effects than topical applications, such as stomach cramps and severe discoloration of teeth. Common antibiotics prescribed as of 2001 by dermatologists included doxycycline and minocycline.

Isotretinoin is used primarily for severe cystic acne and acne that has not responded to other treatments. Many dermatologists also support its use for treatment of lesser degrees of acne that prove resistant to other treatments, or that produce physical or psychological scarring. It is teratogenic, and requires strict prevention of pregnancy during its use.

=== Expression ===
Expression, the manual bursting of pimples which have evolved into whiteheads with one's fingers (colloquially, "popping"), can allow bacteria to be introduced into the open wound this creates. This can result in infection and permanent scarring. Thus expression is generally recommended against by dermatologists and estheticians in favour of allowing pimples to run through their natural lifespans. Some dermatologists offer incision and drainage services to sterilely drain the pimple.
