= John Fordyce =

John Fordyce may refer to:

- John Fordyce (priest) (died 1751), Church of England priest
- John Fordyce (politician) (1735–1809), British Member of Parliament
- John Fordyce (missionary) (1819–1902), Christian missionary and evangelical minister
- John Addison Fordyce (1858–1925), American dermatologist
