= Sebaceoma =

- Other names: Sebaceous epithelioma
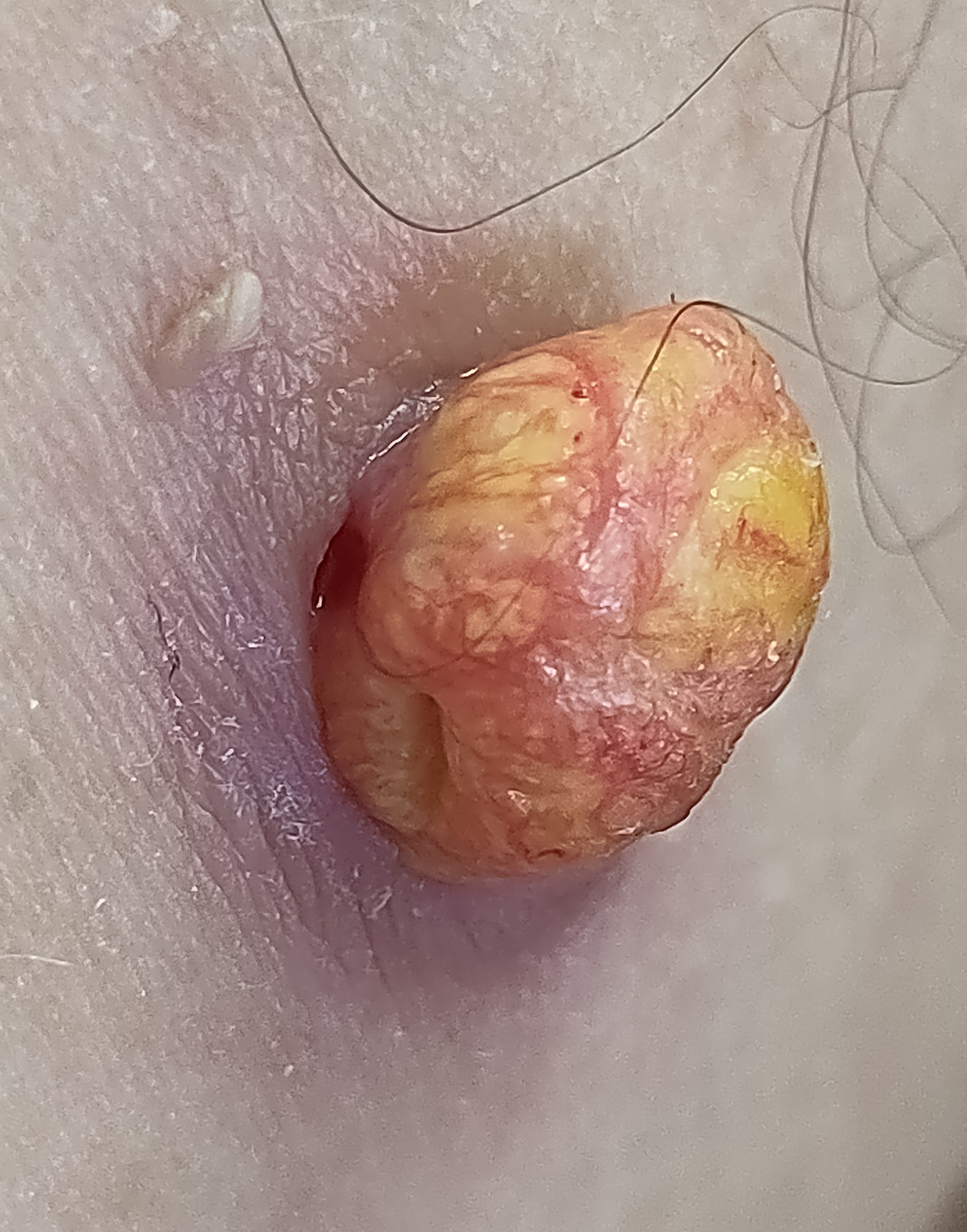
- Sebaceoma. From the skin near the armpit. 80 year old man.
- Specialty: Dermatology

Sebaceoma, also known as a sebaceous epithelioma, is a cutaneous condition that appears as a yellow or orange papule.

== Signs and symptoms ==
Sebaceoma is a smooth-bordered, plump, well-circumscribed benign tumor that may expand into the subcutis, middle dermis, and deep dermis. Lesions range in size from tiny lesions to 20 mm. Clinically, the tumor appears as a single flesh-colored or erythematous nodule or plaque in the head and neck region. It is seldom seen in other body locations. It can also occasionally become crusted or erosive.

== Causes ==
Sebaceoma is associated with Muir-Torre syndrome.

== Diagnosis ==
Strict histologic criteria, extensive tissue sample, and wide excision biopsy should all be fulfilled before a diagnosis of sebaceoma is made.

Sebaceomas are tumors of the skin according to histopathology, however they usually raise the epidermis. The individual lobules, which are made up of mature sebaceous cells and basaloid cells, are divided by dense eosinophilic connective tissue. There is stromal-tumor clefting, no peripheral palisading, and no organized lobular architecture. There may be visible little nucleoli, but there is no nuclear pleomorphism. There are either very few or no mitoses. Duct development is frequent, and sebaceous debris-filled cysts with an eosinophilic cuticle are occasionally observed. In the basaloid section, there is no tumor necrosis.

== See also ==
- Sebaceous carcinoma
- Sebaceous adenoma
- Skin lesion
