= Angiokeratoma =

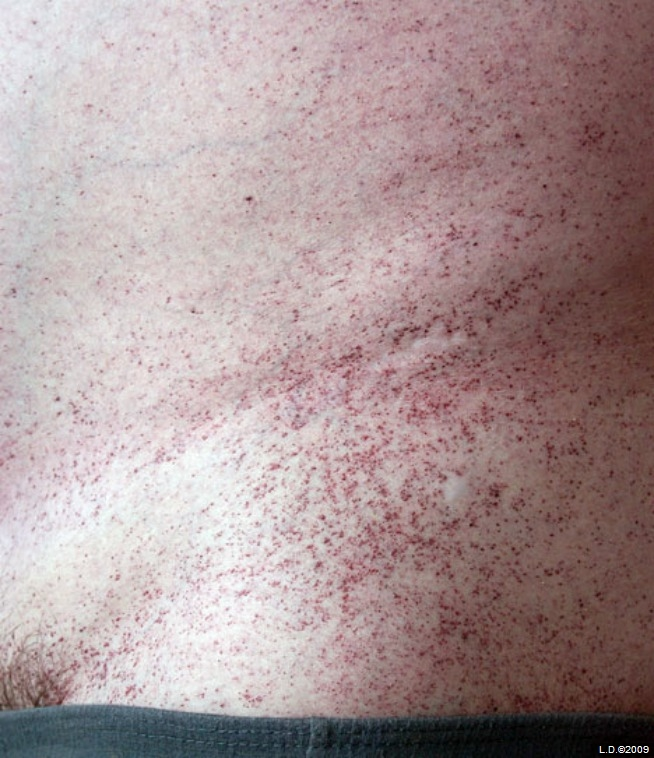
- Specialty: Oncology, dermatology

Angiokeratoma is a benign cutaneous lesion of capillaries, resulting in small marks of red to blue color and characterized by hyperkeratosis. Angiokeratoma corporis diffusum refers to Fabry's disease, but this is usually considered a distinct condition.

== Signs and symptoms ==
Presentation includes telangiectasia, acanthosis, and hyperkeratosis.

Presentation can be solitary or systemic.

Multiple angiokeratomas, especially on the trunk in young people, are typical for Fabry disease, genetic disorder connected with systemic complications.

=== Complications ===
In some instances nodular angiokeratomas can produce necrotic tissue and valleys that can harbor fungal, bacterial and viral infections. Infections can include staphylococcus. If the lesion becomes painful, begins draining fluids or pus, or begins to smell, a doctor may recommend excision and grafting.

== Pathophysiology ==
=== Histology ===
Angiokeratomas characteristically have large dilated blood vessels in the superficial dermis and hyperkeratosis (overlying the dilated vessels).

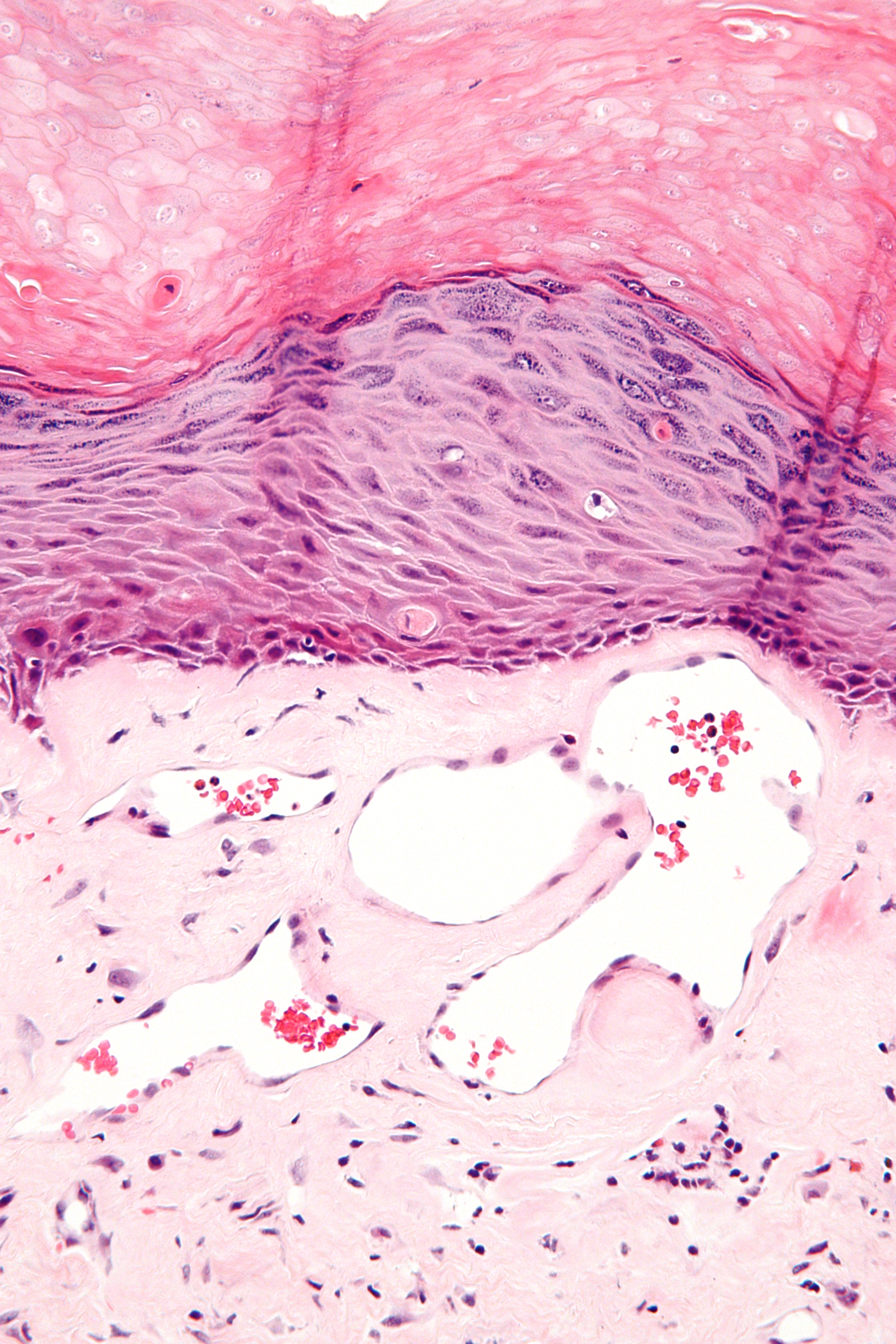
Scrotal angiokeratoma; visible large dilated blood vessels and hyperkeratosis

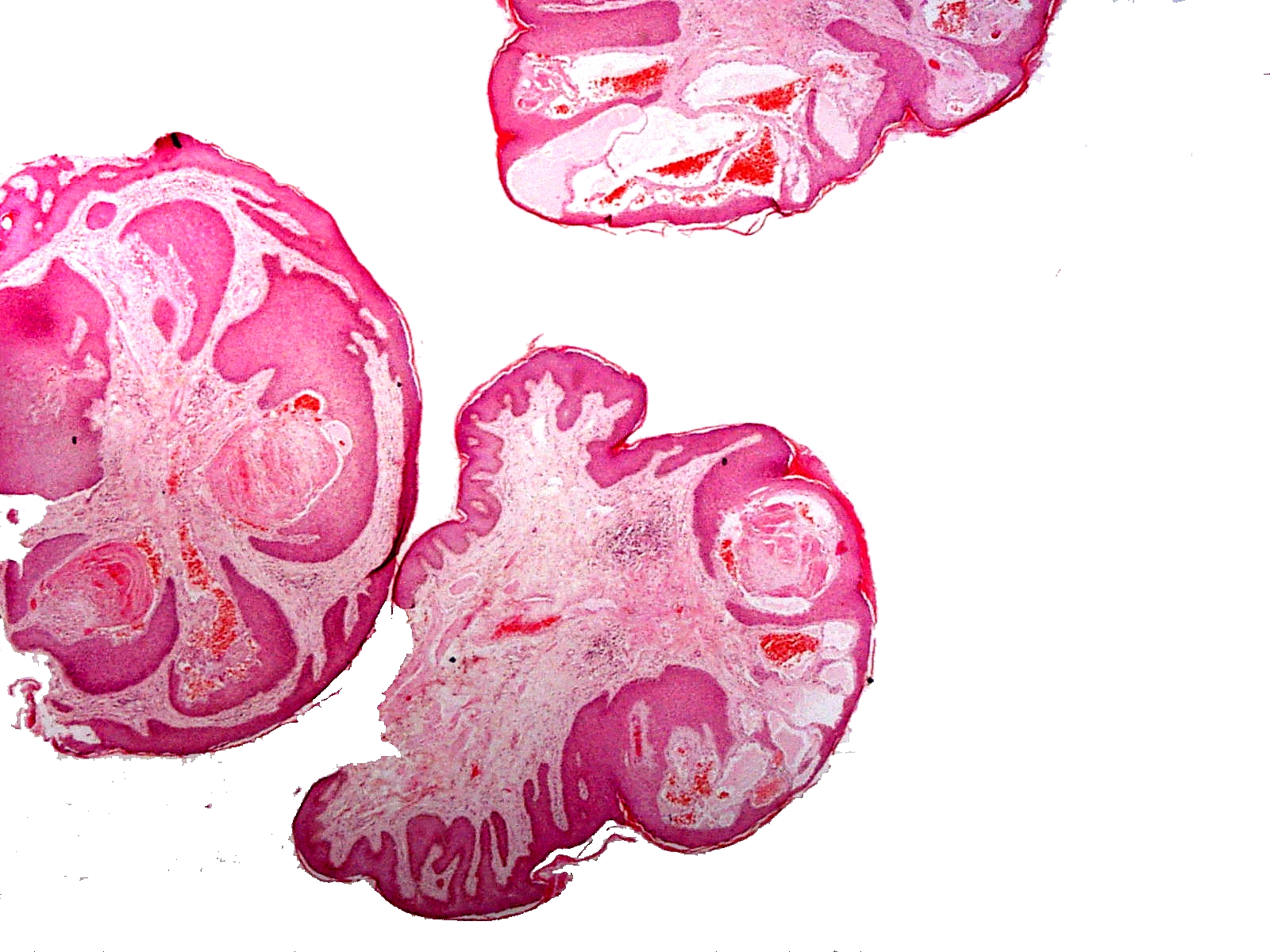
Scrotal angiokeratoma (Fordyce type); multiple papules made by dilatated capillaries

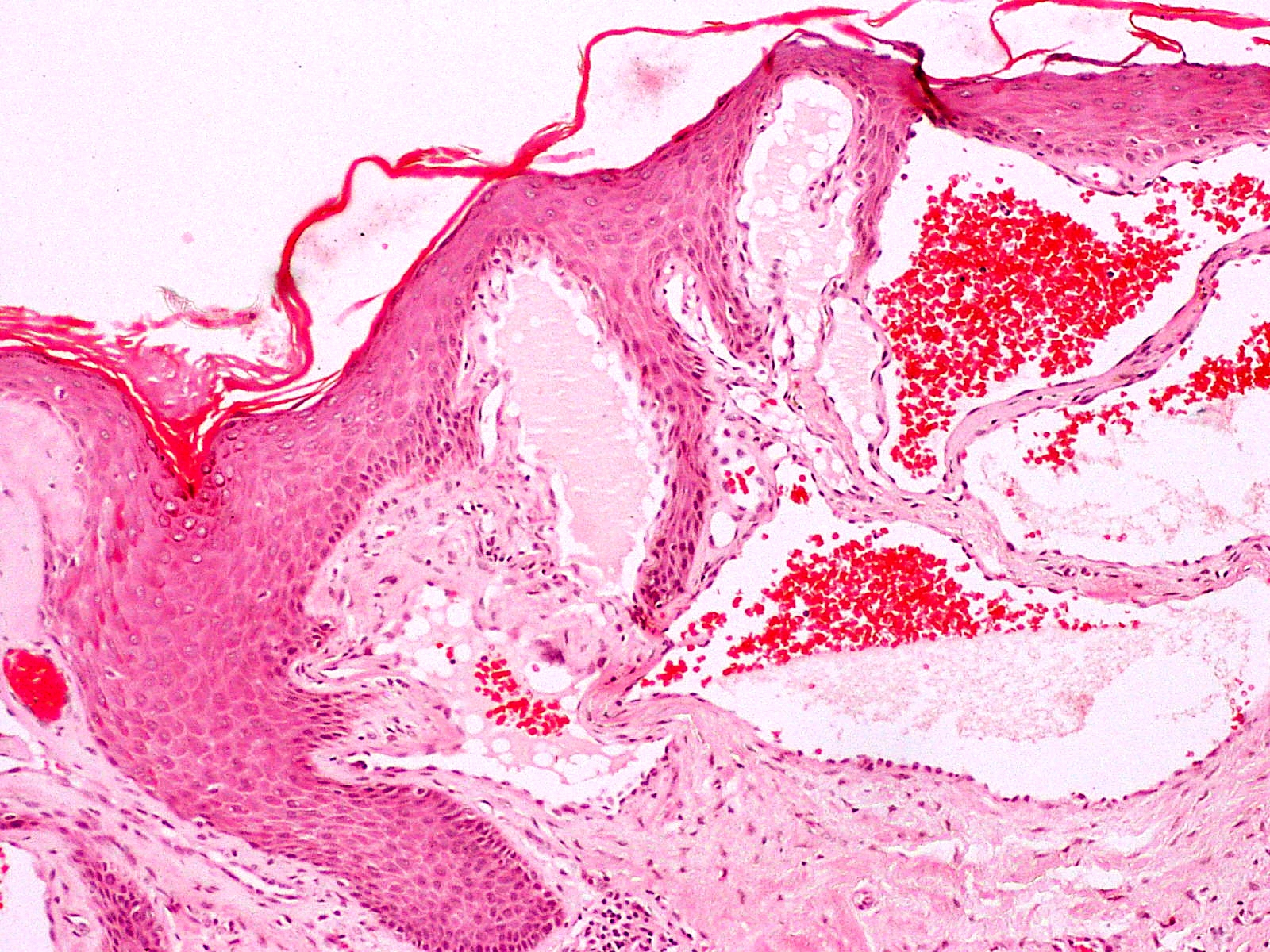
Scrotal angiokeratoma (Fordyce type); dilated cavernous capillaries, acanthosis

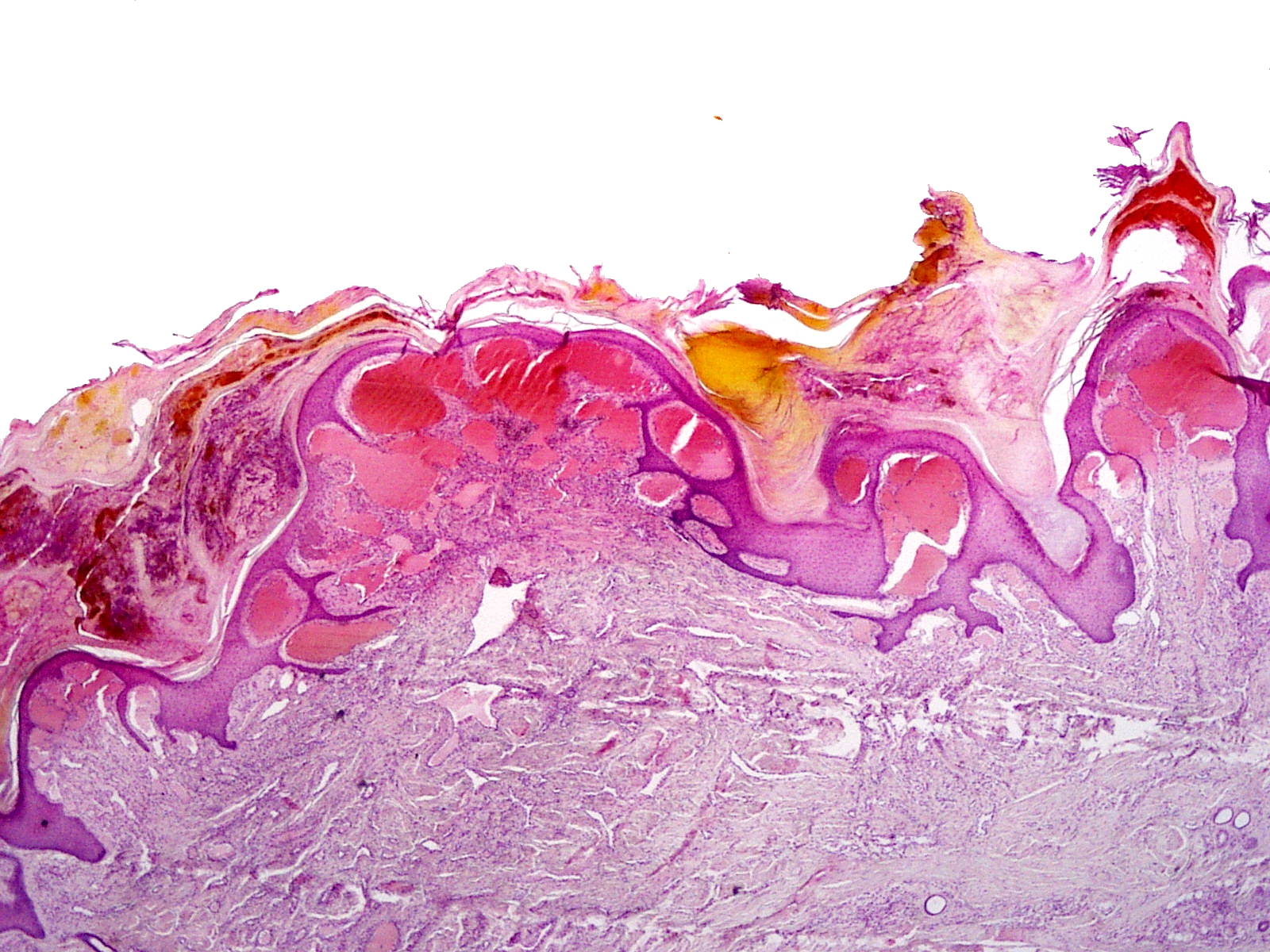
Scrotal angiokeratoma (Mibelli type); blood vessels close to the epidermis

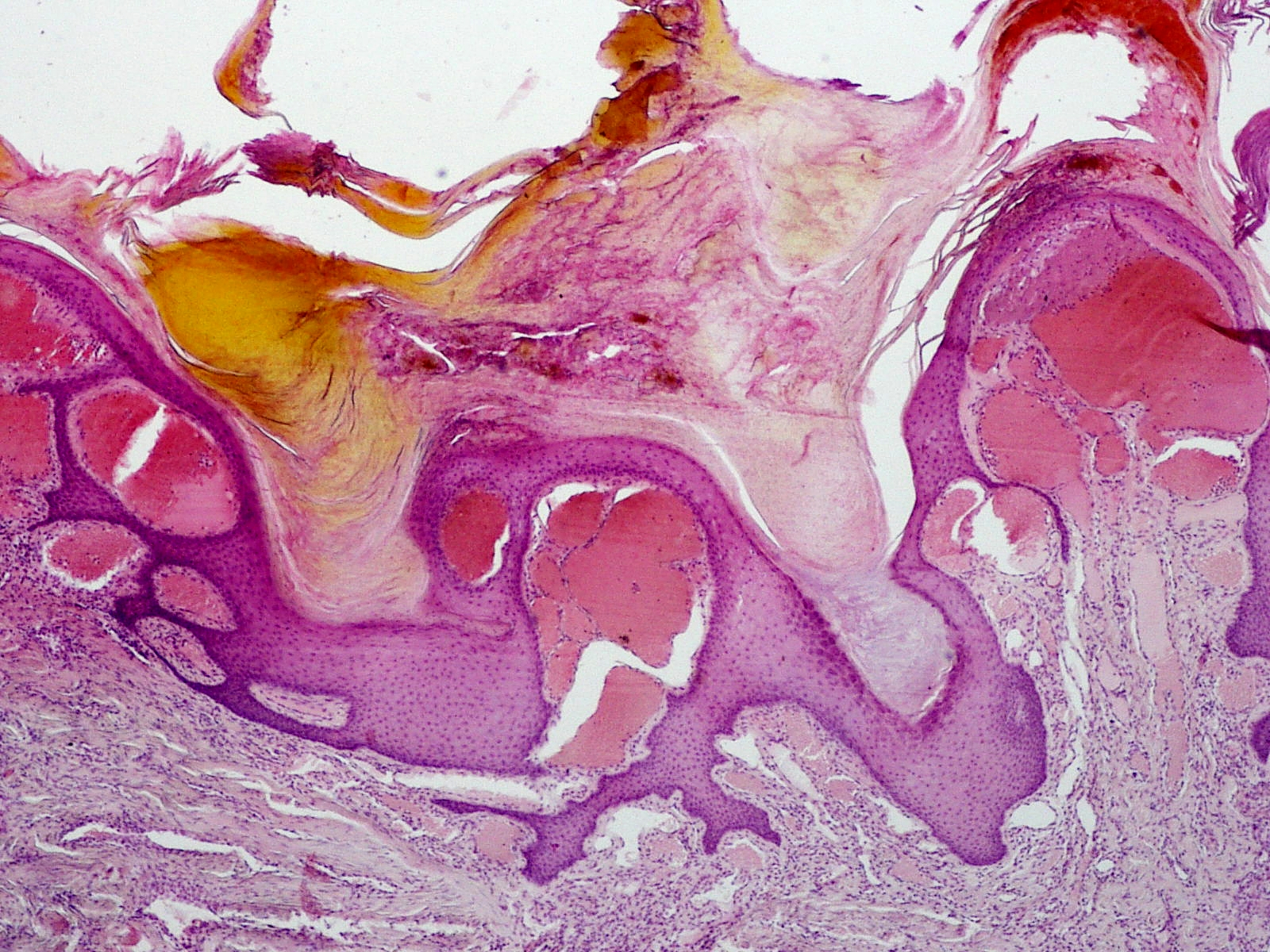
Angiokeratoma (Mibelli type)

== Diagnosis ==
=== Classification ===
Angiokeratoma may be classified as:

- Angiokeratoma of Mibelli (also known as "Mibelli's angiokeratoma," "Telangiectatic warts") consists of 1- to 5-mm red vascular papules, the surfaces of which become hyperkeratotic in the course of time. The disease is named after Italian dermatologist Vittorio Mibelli (1860–1910).
- Angiokeratoma of Fordyce (also known as "Angiokeratoma of the scrotum and vulva," though not to be confused with Fordyce's spots) is a skin condition characterized by red to blue papules on the scrotum or vulva.
- Solitary angiokeratoma is a small, bluish-black, warty papule that occurs predominantly on the lower extremities.
- Verrucous vascular malformation (also known as "Angiokeratoma circumscriptum naeviforme") is a malformation of dermal and subcutaneous capillaries and veins, a congenital vascular malformation, which, over time, a verrucous component appears.

== Treatment ==
Different treatment options exist including cryotherapy, laser therapy, and excision.

== See also ==
- Fabry disease
- List of cutaneous conditions
