= Seboacanthoma =

- Specialty: Dermatology

Seboacanthoma is a cutaneous condition, and a specific type of sebaceous adenoma which may be specific to Muir–Torre syndrome.

== See also ==
- Sebaceous nevus syndrome
- List of cutaneous conditions
