= Fordyce spots =

Sebaceous glands that are present in most individuals

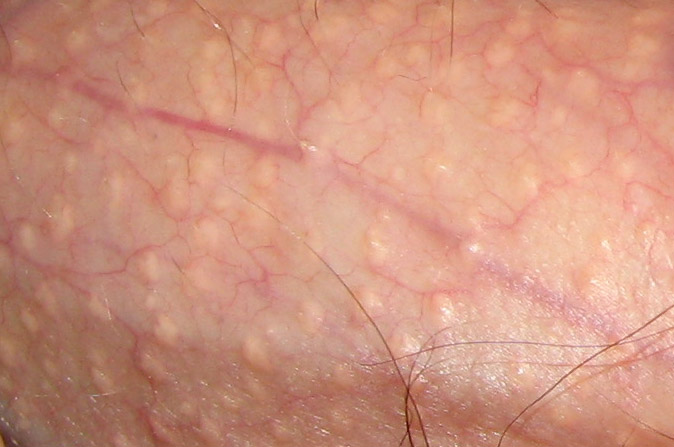
- Close-up of Fordyce spots on penis (shaft)

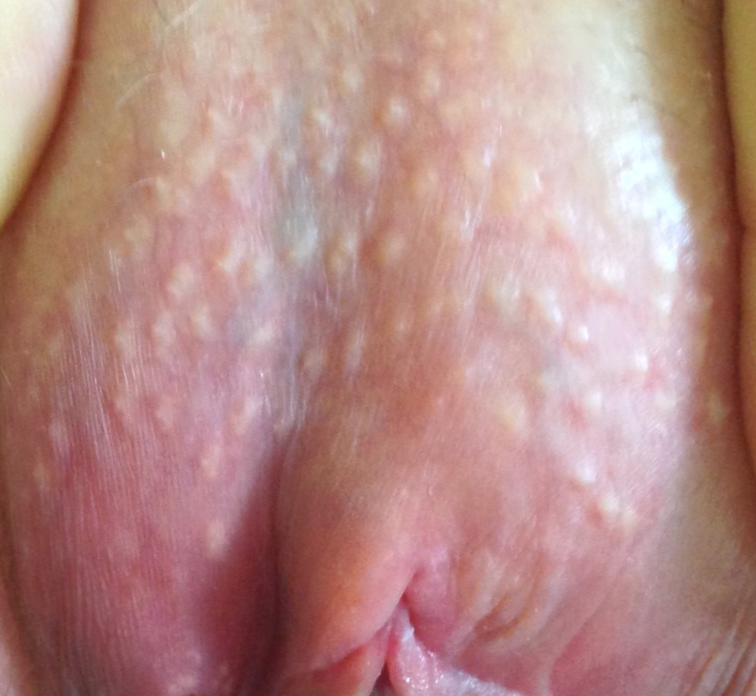
- Fordyce spots on vulva

Fordyce spots (also termed Fordyce granules) are harmless and painless visible sebaceous glands typically appearing as white/yellow small bumps or spots on the inside of lips or cheeks, gums, or genitalia. They are common, and are present in around 80% of adults. Treatment is generally not required and attempts to remove them typically result in pain and scarring.

Their cause is unclear, and they are not associated with hair follicles. Diagnosis is done by visualisation. They may appear similar to genital warts or molluscum. They were first described in 1896 by American dermatologist John Addison Fordyce.

== History ==
Fordyce spots are named after the American dermatologist John Addison Fordyce, who first described them in 1896.

== Classification ==
Sebaceous glands are normal structures of the skin but may also be found ectopically in the mouth, where they are referred to as oral Fordyce granules or ectopic sebaceous glands. On the foreskin, they are called Tyson's glands, but should not be confused with hirsuties coronae glandis.

When they appear on the penis, they are called penile sebaceous glands.

== Signs and symptoms ==
They appear as small, painless, raised, pale, red or white spots or bumps 1 to 3 mm in diameter that may appear on the scrotum, shaft of the penis, or on the labia, as well as the inner surface (retromolar mucosa) and vermilion border of the lips of the face. They are not associated with any disease or illness, nor are they infectious but rather they represent a natural occurrence on the body. Therefore, no treatment is required. People with this condition sometimes consult a dermatologist because they are worried they may have a sexually transmitted infection (especially genital warts) or some form of cancer.

== Description ==
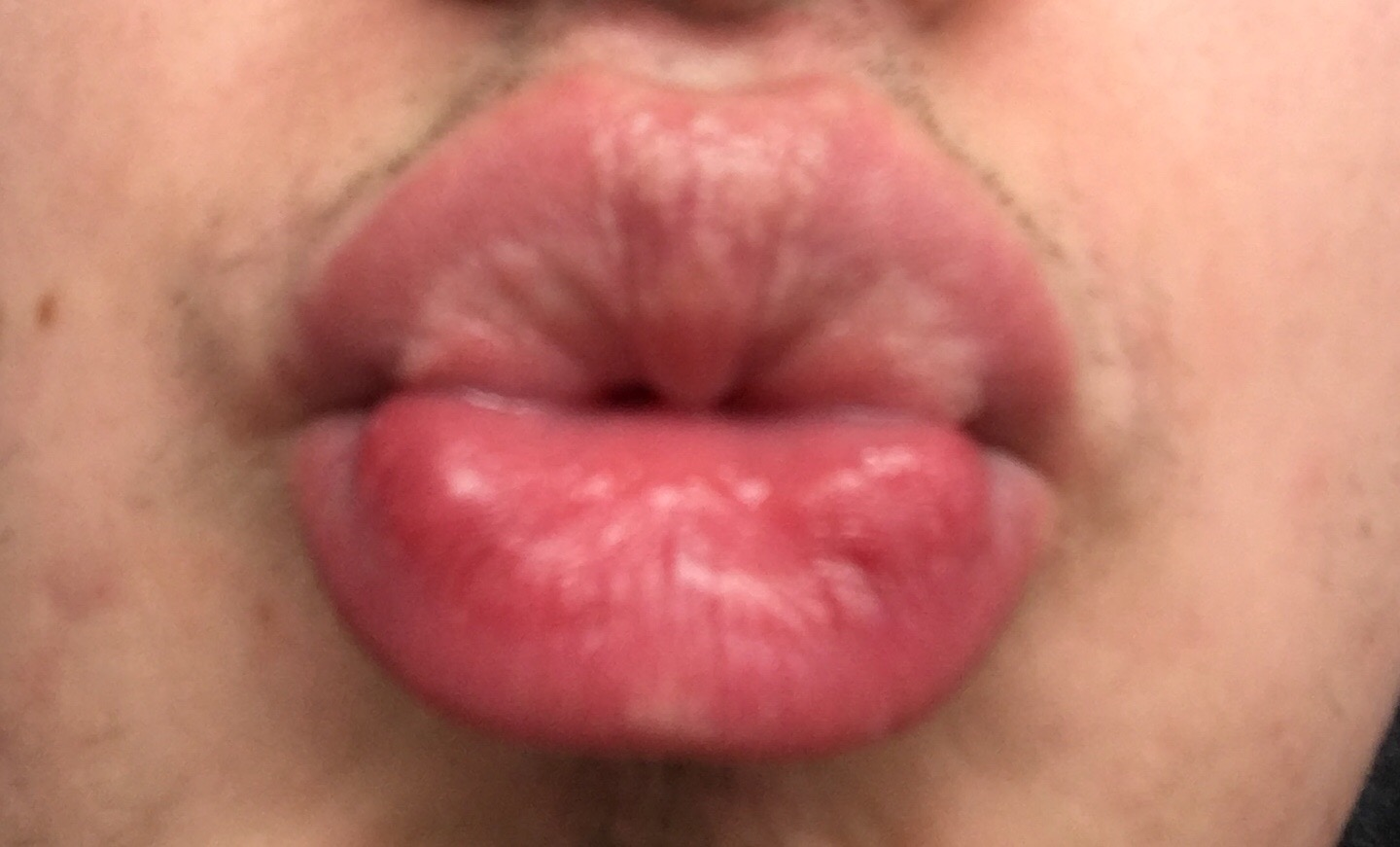
Fordyce spots on lips

On the shaft of the penis, Fordyce spots are more visible when the skin is stretched, and may only be noticeable during an erection. The spots can also appear on the skin of the scrotum.

Oral Fordyce granules appear as rice-like granules, white or yellow-white in color. They are painless papules (small bumps), about 1–3 mm in greatest dimension. The most common site is along the line between the vermilion border and the oral mucosa of the upper lip, or on the buccal mucosa (inside the cheeks) in the commissural region, often bilaterally. They may also occur on the mandibular retromolar pad and tonsillar areas, but any oral surface may be involved. There is no surrounding mucosal change. Some patients will have hundreds of granules while most have only one or two.

Occasionally, several adjacent glands will coalesce into a larger cauliflower-like cluster similar to sebaceous hyperplasia of the skin. In such an instance, it may be difficult to determine whether or not to diagnose the lesion as sebaceous hyperplasia or sebaceous adenoma. The distinction may be moot because both entities have the same treatment, although the adenoma has a greater growth potential. Sebaceous carcinoma of the oral cavity has been reported, presumably arising from Fordyce granules or hyperplastic foci of sebaceous glands.

In some persons with Fordyce spots, the glands express a thick, chalky discharge when squeezed.

== Causes ==
They appear to be more obvious in people with oily skin types, with some rheumatic disorders, and in hereditary nonpolyposis colorectal cancer. In the latter, the most common site for Fordyce spots is the lower gingiva (gums) and vestibular mucosa.

== Diagnosis ==
Large numbers of lobules coalescing into a definitely elevated mass may be called benign sebaceous hyperplasia, and occasional small keratin-filled pseudocysts may be seen and must be differentiated from epidermoid cyst or dermoid cyst with sebaceous adnexa. The pathologist must be careful to differentiate such lesions from salivary neoplasms with sebaceous cells, such as sebaceous lymphadenoma and sebaceous carcinoma.

Oral Fordyce granules are usually not biopsied because they are readily diagnosed clinically, but they are often seen as incidental findings of mucosal biopsies of the buccal, labial and retromolar mucosa. The granules are similar to normal sebaceous glands of the skin but lack hair follicles and almost always lack a ductal communication with the surface. The glands are located just beneath the overlying epithelium and often produce a local elevation of the epithelium. Individual sebaceous cells are large, with central dark nuclei and abundant foamy cytoplasm.

=== Differential ===
Some diseases may appear similar to Fordyce spots such as sexually transmitted infections.

== Prognosis ==
Fordyce spots are completely benign and require no treatment. They occur in 70 to 80 percent of adults.

== Epidemiology ==
They are present in around 80% of adults. They are not usually visible in children, and tend to appear at about age 3, then increasing during puberty and become more obvious in later adulthood. They are more prominent in males.
