= Vittorio Mibelli =

Italian dermatologist (1860–1910)

- Born: 18 February 1860; Portoferraio, Elba, Italy
- Died: 26 April 1910 (aged 50)
- Occupation: Dermatologist

Vittorio Mibelli (18 February 1860 – 26 April 1910) was an Italian dermatologist born in Portoferraio, Elba.

He studied in Siena and Florence, afterwards working in Siena as a prosector at the anatomical institute and later as an assistant at the dermatology clinic. In 1888 he gained his habilitation, spending the following year in Hamburg, working with dermatologist Paul Gerson Unna (1850–1929). In 1890 he became an associate professor and director of dermatology clinic at the University of Cagliari. Two years later, he relocated to Parma, where he held the title of full professor from 1900 until his death in 1910.

== Works ==
His name is associated with two skin disorders: angiokeratoma of Mibelli and porokeratosis of Mibelli. He described these diseases in issues of the Giornale italiano di dermatologia e venereologia (Italian Journal of Dermatology and Sexually Transmitted Diseases).

- "Di una nuova forma di cheratosi angiocheratoma." Giornale italiano di dermatologia e venereologia 30 (1889): 285–301.
- "L'angiocheratoma." Giornale italiano di dermatologia e venereologia 26 (1891): 159–180, 260–276.
- "Contributo alla studio della ipercheratosi dei canali sudoriferi (porokeratosi)." Giornale italiano di dermatologia e venereologia 28 (1893): 313–355.
