= Nasal sebum =

Oil removed from the human nose

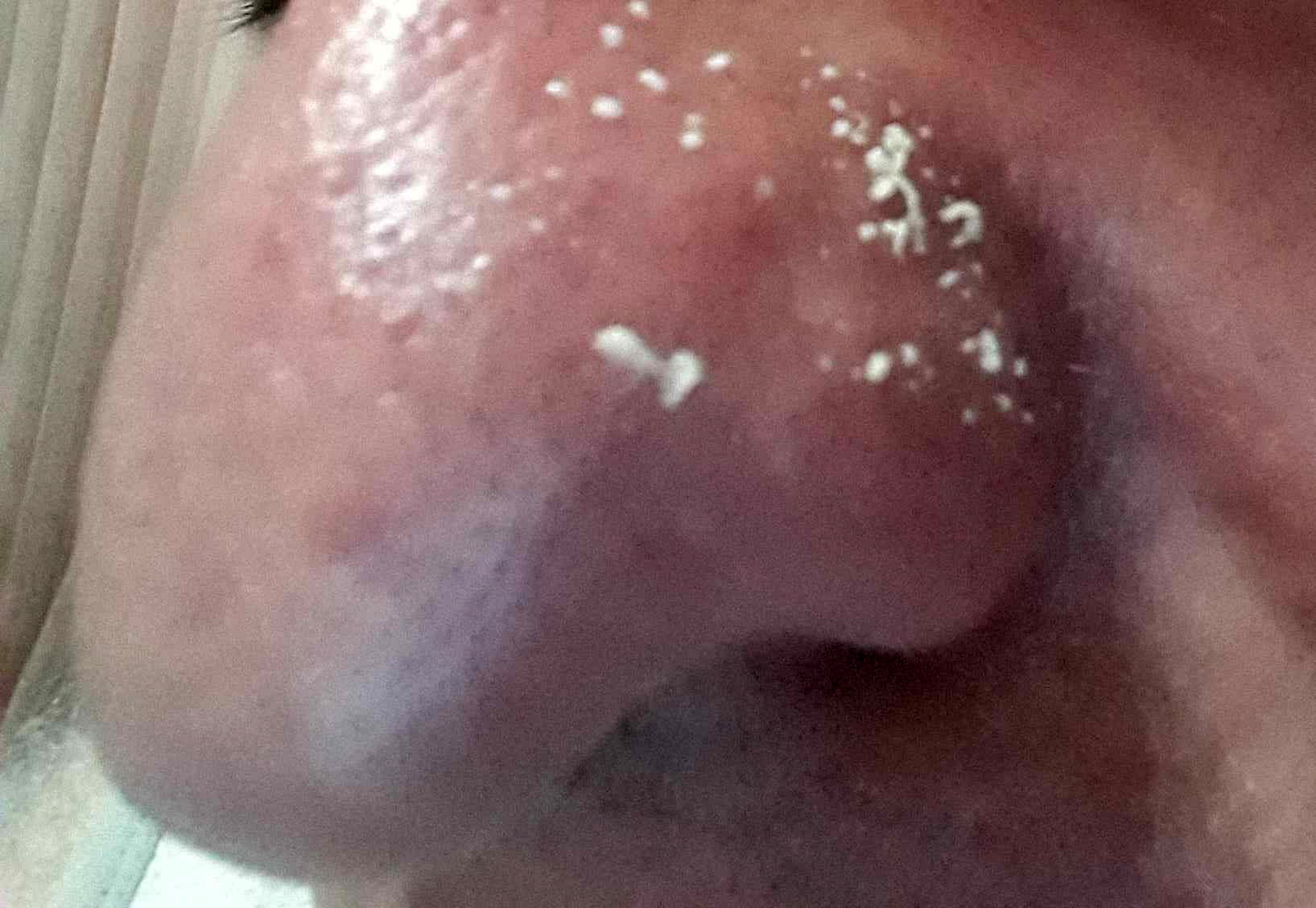
Expressed nasal sebum on the surface of the human nose.

Nasal sebum, also known as nose grease/oil, is the oily secretion of sebaceous glands located on the surface of the human nose. The pores of the lateral creases (where the nose joins the face) of the exterior of the nose create and store more oil and grease than pores elsewhere on the human body, forming a readily available source of small quantities of grease or oil.

== Sebum chemical composition ==
Sebum is produced by sebaceous glands from the skin. Sebum has a complex composition that is different from epidermal lipids found anywhere in the human body, for example, squalene and wax esters are only found in sebum. Triglycerides and fatty acids, taken together, account for the predominant proportion (57.5%), followed by wax esters (26%) and squalene (12%). The least abundant lipid in sebum is cholesterol, which with its esters, accounts for the 4.5% of total lipids.

== Other uses of sebum ==
Nose grease has been reported to be a convenient durable lubricant. Nose grease can be used to minimize scratches in optical surfaces, for example when cleaning photographic negatives. Observatory lore holds that nose grease was used to reduce stray light and reflections in transmissive telescopes before the development of vacuum antireflective coatings. The antireflective properties are due in part to the fact that the nose oil fills small cracks and scratches and forms a smooth, polished surface, and in part to the low index of refraction of the oil, which can reduce surface reflection from transmissive optics that have a high index of refraction. The same effect is sometimes used by numismatic hobbyists to alter the apparent grade of slightly worn coins.

Nose grease is often recommended as a lubricant for fly fishing rod ferrules.

Nose grease has mild antifoaming properties and can be used to break down a high head on freshly poured beer or soft drinks. Wiping nose grease onto one's finger and then touching or stirring the foam causes it to dissipate rapidly.

The Doctor's Book of Home Remedies suggests using nasal sebum as a remedy for chapped lips.
