= Comedo =

- Other names: Plural: comedones
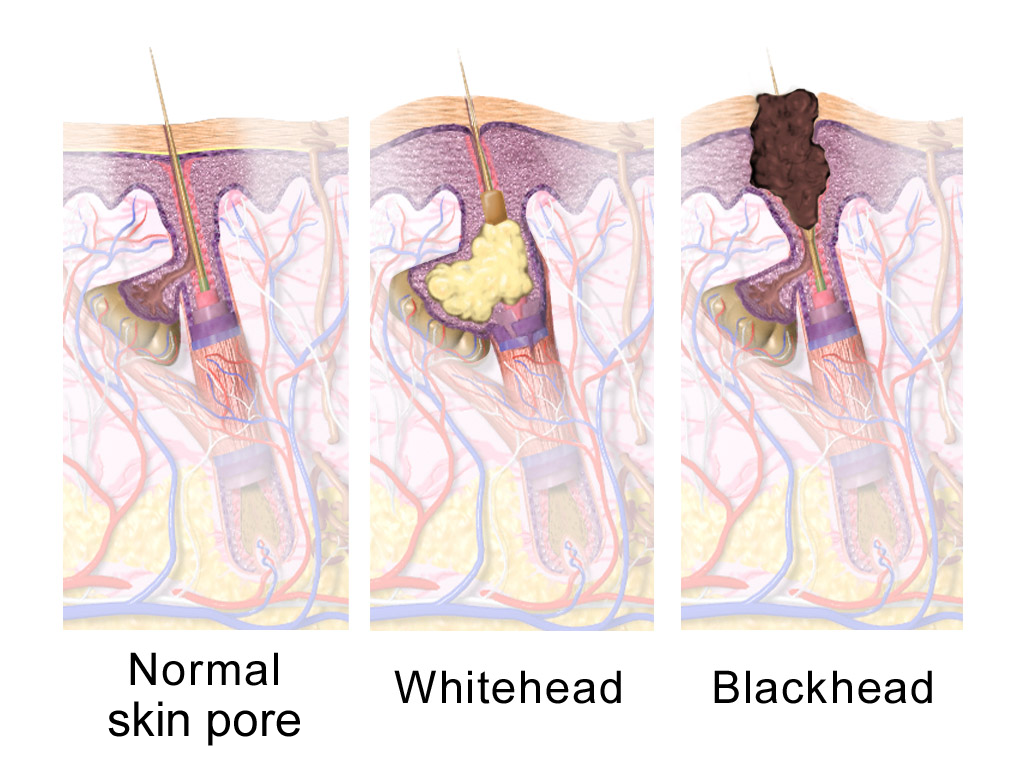
- Illustration comparing a normal skin pore with a whitehead and a blackhead
- Specialty: Dermatology

A comedo (plural comedones) is a clogged hair follicle (pore) in the skin. Keratin (skin debris) combines with oil to block the follicle. A comedo can be open (blackhead) or closed by skin (whitehead) and occur with or without acne. The word comedo comes from Latin comedere 'to eat up' and was historically used to describe parasitic worms; in modern medical terminology, it is used to suggest the worm-like appearance of the expressed material.

The chronic inflammatory condition that usually includes comedones, inflamed papules, and pustules (pimples) is called acne. Infection causes inflammation and the development of pus. Whether a skin condition classifies as acne depends on the number of comedones and infection. Comedones should not be confused with sebaceous filaments.

Comedo-type ductal carcinoma in situ (DCIS) is not related to the skin conditions discussed here. DCIS is a noninvasive form of breast cancer, but comedo-type DCIS may be more aggressive, so may be more likely to become invasive.

== Causes ==
Oil production in the sebaceous glands increases during puberty, causing comedones and acne to be common in adolescents. Acne is also found premenstrually and in women with polyendocrine metabolic ovarian syndrome. Smoking may worsen acne.

Oxidation rather than poor hygiene or dirt causes blackheads to be black. Washing or scrubbing the skin too much could make it worse, by irritating the skin. Touching and picking at comedones might cause irritation and spread infection. What effect shaving has on the development of comedones or acne is unclear.

Some skin products might increase comedones by blocking pores, and greasy hair products (such as pomades) can worsen acne. Skin products that claim not to clog pores may be labeled noncomedogenic or nonacnegenic. Make-up and skin products that are oil-free and water-based may be less likely to cause acne. Whether dietary factors or sun exposure make comedones better, worse, or neither is unknown.

A hair that does not emerge normally, an ingrown hair, can also block the pore and cause a bulge or lead to infection (causing inflammation and pus).

Genes may play a role in the chances of developing acne. Comedones may be more common in some ethnic groups. People of Latino and recent African descent may experience more inflammation in comedones, more comedonal acne, and earlier onset of inflammation.

== Pathophysiology ==
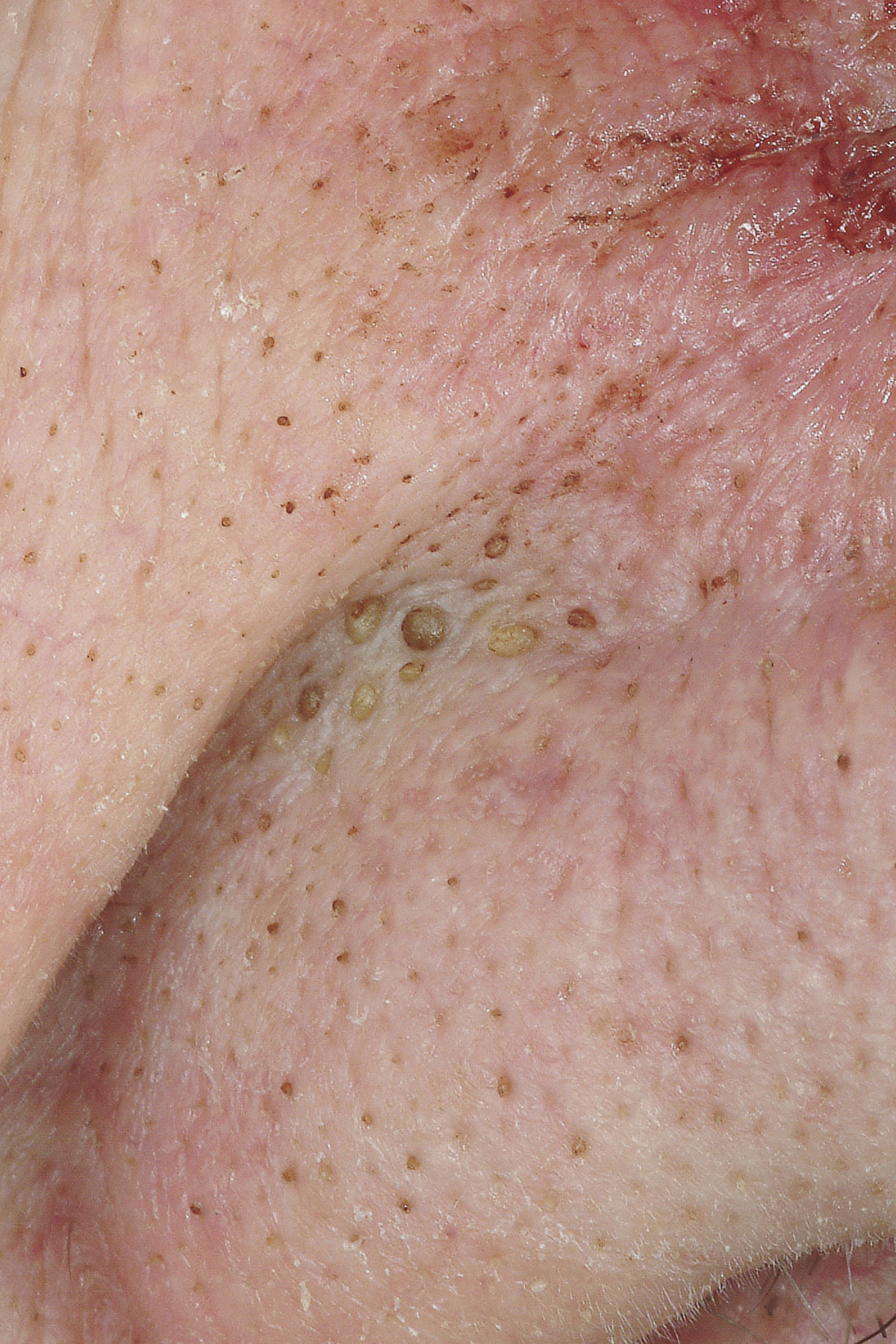
Multiple open comedones at the nasolabial fold and the alar of the nose

Comedones are associated with the pilosebaceous unit, which includes a hair follicle and sebaceous gland. These units are mostly on the face, neck, upper chest, shoulders, and back. Excess keratin combined with sebum can plug the opening of the follicle. This small plug is called a microcomedo. Androgens increase sebum (oil) production. If sebum continues to build up behind the plug, it can enlarge and form a visible comedo.

A comedo may be open to the air ("blackhead") or closed by skin ("whitehead"). Being open to the air causes oxidation of the melanin pigment, which turns it black. Cutibacterium acnes is the suspected infectious agent in acne. It can proliferate in sebum and cause inflamed pustules (pimples) characteristic of acne. Nodules are inflamed, painful, deep bumps under the skin.

Comedones that are 1 mm or larger are called macrocomedones. They are closed comedones and are more frequent on the face than neck.

Solar comedones (sometimes called senile comedones) are related to many years of exposure to the sun, usually on the cheeks, not to acne-related pathophysiology.

== Management ==
Using non-oily cleansers and mild soap may cause less irritation to the skin as regular soap. Blackheads can be removed across an area with commercially available pore-cleansing strips (which can still damage the skin by leaving the pores wide open and ripping excess skin) or the more aggressive cyanoacrylate method used by dermatologists.

Squeezing blackheads and whiteheads can remove them, but can also damage the skin. Doing so increases the risk of causing or transmitting infection and scarring, as well as potentially pushing any infection deeper into the skin. Comedo extractors are used with careful hygiene in beauty salons and by dermatologists, usually after steaming the face or washing in warm water.

Complementary medicine options for acne in general have not been shown to be effective in trials. These include aloe vera, pyridoxine (vitamin B_{6}), fruit-derived acids, kampo (Japanese herbal medicine), ayurvedic herbal treatments, and acupuncture.

Some acne treatments target infection specifically, but some treatments are aimed at the formation of comedones, as well. Others remove the dead layers of the skin and may help clear blocked pores.

Dermatologists can often extract open comedones with minimal skin trauma, but closed comedones are more difficult. Laser treatment for acne might reduce comedones, but dermabrasion and laser therapy have also been known to cause scarring.

Macrocomedones (1 mm or larger) can be removed by a dermatologist using surgical instruments or cauterized with a device that uses light. The acne drug isotretinoin can cause severe flare-ups of macrocomedones, so dermatologists recommend removal before starting the drug and during treatment.

Some research suggests that the common acne medications retinoids and azelaic acid are beneficial and do not cause increased pigmentation of the skin. Retinoids should only be applied at night, since light degrades them and the skin repair cycle peaks at night. Sunscreen should also be used during the day, as the skin becomes more sensitive to UV.

== Rare conditions ==
Favre–Racouchot syndrome occurs in sun-damaged skin and includes open and closed comedones.

Nevus comedonicus, or comedo nevus, is a benign hamartoma (birthmark) of the pilosebaceous unit around the oil-producing gland in the skin. It has widened open hair follicles with dark keratin plugs that resemble comedones, but they are not actually comedones.

Dowling–Degos disease is a genetic pigment disorder that includes comedo-like lesions and scars.

Familial dyskeratotic comedones are a rare autosomal-dominant genetic condition, with keratotic (tough) papules and comedo-like lesions.
