= Fordyce Creek Trail =

- Length: 11.9 miles (19.2 km)
- Location: Tahoe National Forest
- Designation: Jeep Trail
- Trailheads: Western: 39.3366°N 120.57751°W; Eastern: 39.3971°N 120.4988°W
- Difficulty: Difficult. Experts only.
- Hazards: Vehicle damage, rollovers, and strandings at river crossings
- Maintained by: The US National Forest Service (not maintained)
- Website: US Forest Service: Fordyce Jeep Trail

Trail map
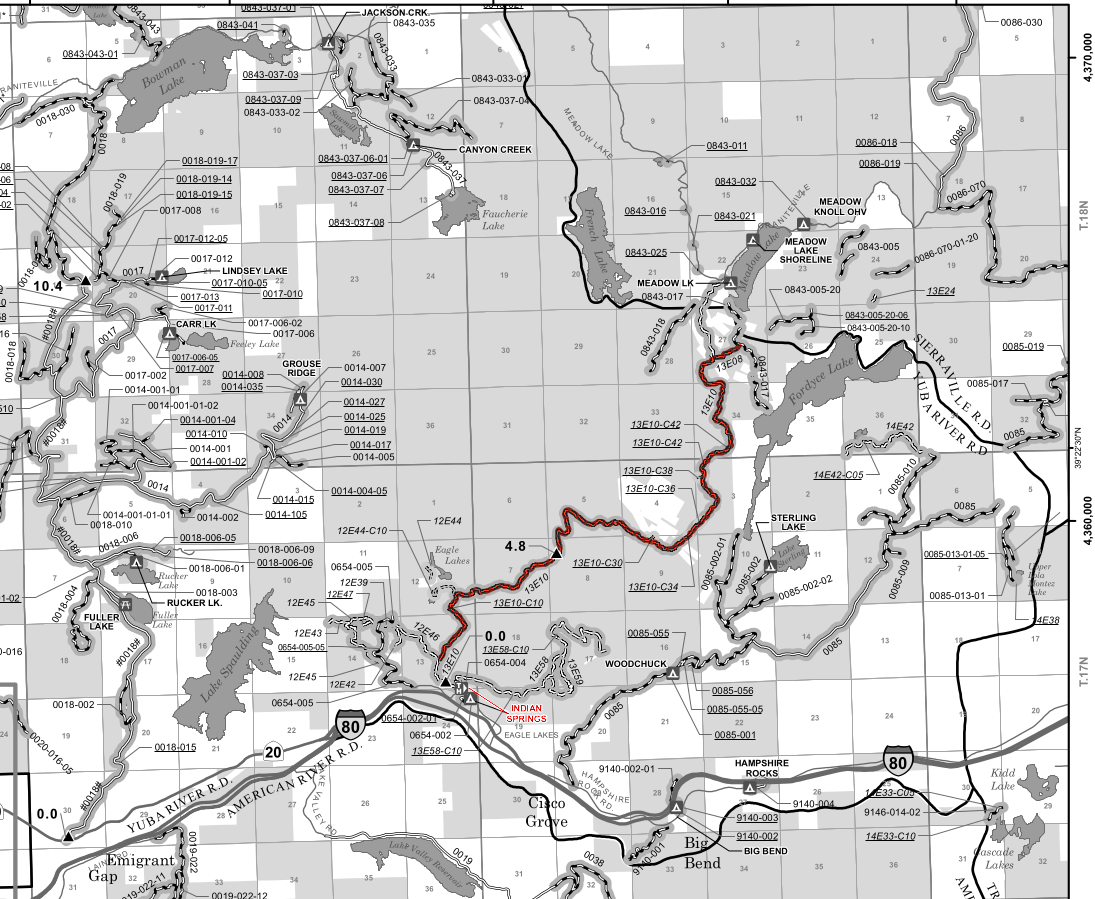
- South Yuba River Motor Vehicle Use Map, cropped

The Fordyce Creek Trail is a rock crawling route in California not far from the Rubicon Trail. The trailhead is just past Indian Springs Campground on Eagle Lakes Road.

The rocky terrain is more dangerous than most off-road trails. There are officially 5 winch-hills combined with several deep water crossings. The overall rock crawling rating of this trail is 4.6 stars.

The first full weekend in August each year is home to Sierra Trek, an event hosted by the California Four Wheel Drive Association,

During 2018's Sierra Trek, a 62-year-old Chico man was killed in a rollover.
