= Sebaceous filament =

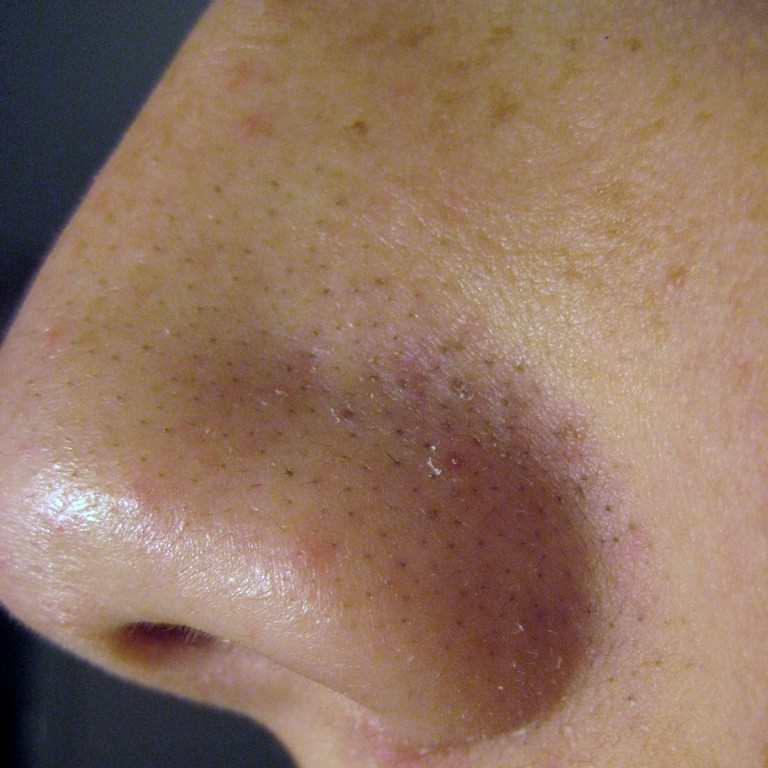
- Sebaceous filaments visible on the nose of a 14-year-old
- Specialty: Dermatology

A sebaceous filament is a tiny collection of sebum and dead skin cells around a hair follicle, which usually takes the form of a small, yellow to off-white hair-like strand when expressed from the skin. These filaments are naturally occurring, and are especially prominent on the nose. They are commonly mistaken for blackheads. In 1979, David A. Whiting described them in a review in the Western Journal of Medicine as "a loose, porous mass of horned detritus".

== Anatomy and physiology ==
Human skin contains sebaceous glands, which secrete an oily substance known as sebum into hair follicles. Sebum travels to the surface of the skin, where it lubricates skin and hair. A sebaceous filament forms in a follicle where a vestigial vellus hair is connected to a large sebaceous gland. Skin cells and keratin form a clump around the hair, but sebum flows freely through the channel. The healthy, unobstructed follicle distinguishes sebaceous filaments from comedones (blackheads and whiteheads), where the follicle is obstructed. It is rare for true comedones to develop from sebaceous filaments.

== Appearance and characteristics ==
Sebaceous filaments are dark in color because they contain skin cells that are exposed to air, turning their melanin pigment black. Sebaceous filaments and blackheads are often confused, but they are not the same thing. While sebaceous filaments are a natural component of pore anatomy, blackheads (open comedones) are considered to be acne. They are caused by the pore becoming clogged with bacteria, dead skin, and sebum. They appear on the skin as black, raised bumps, and can vary in size. After a blackhead heals, it may not come back. Sebaceous filaments do not disappear (even with management) since they are a natural part of the skin and required to bring sebum to the skin surface.
