= Fox–Fordyce disease =

- Other names: Apocrine miliaria
- Specialty: Dermatology

Fox–Fordyce disease (FFD) is a chronic blockage of the sweat gland ducts with a secondary, non-bacterial inflammatory response to the secretions and cellular debris in the cysts. The inflammation is often accompanied by intense itching. In general, the disease often causes skin to darken near the affected area and raised bumps or papules to appear. In addition, hair follicles can become damaged which cause hair loss. Hidradenitis is very similar, but tends to have a secondary bacterial infection so that pus-draining sinuses are formed. It is a very devastating skin disease that does not have universally curative treatments.

== Signs and symptoms ==
Symptoms may appear suddenly following any condition of heat, humidity, or friction. The apocrine glands (sweat glands) are the site of the Fox–Fordyce disease. Sudden appearance of raised bumps (papules) near the apocrine glands is characteristic of the disease. Papules are mostly skin colored, dome shaped, and itchy. Papules can be found at the sweat glands in addition to periareolar, inframammary and pubic areas. Hair follicles can become damaged as well and can result in hair loss in the affected area.

== Causes ==
The exact cause of Fox-Fordyce is currently unknown. Studies have not been able to confirm if apocrine gland duct obstruction is required for development. It is speculated that gland duct rupture causes inflammation. Inflammatory response includes white blood cells. Fox–Fordyce Disease can be a rare side effect of laser hair removal, particularly in areas like the armpits and bikini line, where apocrine sweat glands are concentrated. While lasers, such as the Alex/Diode type, target hair follicles, they can accidentally damage nearby sweat glands, causing them to become blocked and leading to FFD. This condition causes small, itchy bumps that often worsen with heat or sweating. FFD should be considered in patients who develop itchy lesions after laser hair removal, especially those with darker skin tones. Early recognition and treatment can help manage the symptoms.

== Diagnosis ==
Clinical evaluation along with identification of typical symptoms such as the eruption of papules on the apocrine glands along with a patient history report is used to diagnose the disease. Surgical removal along with a microscopic evaluation by a dermatopathologist is the most reliable form of diagnosis.

== Treatment ==
With only a small number of case reports, treatment can be difficult and focuses primarily on axillary disease and specific symptoms. First line treatment includes topical and intralesional glucocorticoids. Specific therapies include estrogen hormones and steroid creams. Use of tretinoin reduced pruritic and axillary papules in one study. However, irritation limited drug use to short term only. Clindamycin mixed with pimecrolimus cream and benzoyl peroxide was also effective. Clindamycin is used to inhibit bacterial growth and is used when treating staphylococcal and streptococcal infections.

== Epidemiology ==
It most commonly affects women aged 13–35 years, approximately puberty through their prime. Some reports show affected women to men at 9:1. Rare cases have been shown to affect post-menopausal women, children, and men. Incident report is currently unknown. Although rare, men and children have been shown to be affected. Heat, humidity, stress, and exercise have been shown to worsen symptoms. Rate of incidence is currently unknown. Fox-Fordyce has also been shown to be severe during menstruation and spontaneously disappear during pregnancy.

== Eponym ==
It is named for George Henry Fox and John Addison Fordyce.

== See also ==
- List of cutaneous conditions
