= Michael W. Fordyce =

Happiness psychologist (1944–2011)

Michael W. Fordyce from his Happiness Training Program

Michael W. Fordyce (December 14, 1944 – January 24, 2011) was an American psychologist and a pioneer researcher in the field of empirical happiness measurement and intervention. As a forerunner who approached "happiness" as an applied science, he ushered-in the modern academic branch of Positive Psychology

Fordyce contributed a happiness-measurement article to the journal Social Indicators Research, which ranked in the journal's top 2.4% most-cited articles. He demonstrated that happiness can be statistically measured and willfully increased (i.e. through "volitional" behavior).

Fordyce worked at Edison State Community College (formerly Edison Community College) in Fort Myers, Florida, where he taught a data-driven "happiness training program" in the form of a college-level course known as Personal Social Adjustment for over three decades.
