= Sebaceous carcinoma =

Malignant tumor of oil glands in the skin

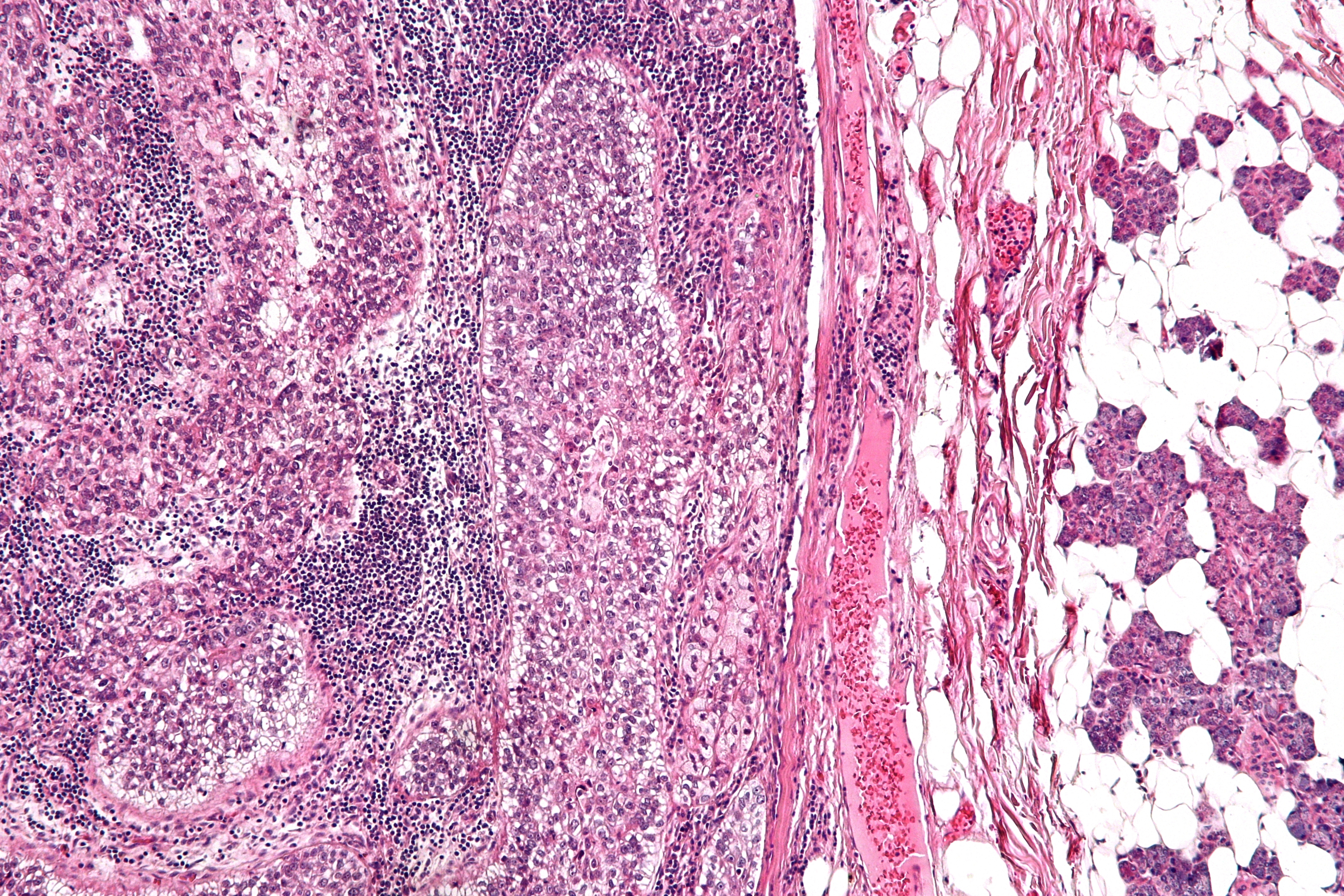
- Micrograph of a sebaceous carcinoma (left of image) metastatic to the parotid gland (right of image). H&E stain.
- Specialty: Oncology, dermatology

Sebaceous carcinoma, also known as sebaceous gland carcinoma (SGc), sebaceous cell carcinoma, and meibomian gland carcinoma, is an uncommon malignant cutaneous (skin) tumor. Most are typically about 1.4 cm at presentation. SGc originates from sebaceous glands in the skin and, therefore, may originate anywhere in the body where these glands are found. SGc can be divided into 2 types: periocular and extraocular. The periocular region is rich in sebaceous glands, making it a common site of origin. The cause of these lesions in the vast majority of cases is unknown. Occasional cases may be associated with Muir-Torre syndrome. SGc accounts for approximately 0.7% of all skin cancers, and the incidence of SGc is highest in Caucasian, Asian, and Indian populations. Due to the rarity of this tumor and variability in clinical and histological presentation, SGc is often misdiagnosed as an inflammatory condition or a more common neoplasm. SGc is commonly treated with wide local excision or Mohs micrographic surgery, and the relative survival rates at 5 and 10 years are 92.72 and 86.98%, respectively.

== Epidemiology ==
SGc accounts for approximately 0.7% of all skin cancers and 0.2 to 4.6% of all malignant cutaneous neoplasms. Notable risk factors include age, gender, and race. Over 98% of SGc occur in patients over the age of 40. The mean age of diagnosis for periocular and extraocular SGc is around 67 years. Periocular SGc tends to be more common in women, while extraocular SGc tends to be more common in men. SGc is extraordinarily rare in children, with only a few cases reported. There is a higher incidence of SGc in Caucasians, Asians, and Indians. While SGc affects Caucasians over 80% of the time, SGc tends to be more prevalent in the Eastern versus Western Hemisphere, contributing to 33% of eyelid malignancies in China versus 1–5.5% in Caucasians. The higher incidence of SGc in Asian populations may be due to the lower incidence of other eyelid tumors or genetic.

== Presentation ==
Sebaceous carcinoma is a neoplastic growth of sebaceous glands. It is predominantly seen in the head and neck region, given the high density of sebaceous glands in this region. The periocular region, which includes the meibomian, Zeis, and sebaceous glands of the caruncle and eyelid, is the most common site accounting for up to 75% of SGc. Meibomian glands are a type of sebaceous gland that lines the upper and lower eyelids and do not contain a follicle. The glands of Zeis contain the individual eyelash. The upper eyelid contains more meibomian glands than the lower eyelid, and consequently, SGc is 2-3 times more common in the upper eyelid.

Periocular SGc most commonly presents as a yellow, hard, painless, subcutaneous nodule or papule, which may rapidly enlarge, and may be confused with chalazion, blepharitis, conjunctivitis, or other inflammatory conditions of the eye.

Extraocular SGc accounts for approximately 25% of all SGc. commonly presents as a painless, red and brown or red and yellow, ulcerated papule on the head or neck and may mimic nonmelanoma skin cancers, molluscum contagiosum, adnexal neoplasms, or pyogenic granuloma.

The mean lesion size of periocular and extraocular SGc is approximately 1.4 cm.

== Pathophysiology ==
SGc arises from the adnexal epithelium of sebaceous glands, most commonly the Meibomian glands or glands of Zeis. On histology, there are irregular lobules of different sizes with undifferentiated cells and distinct sebaceous cells with a foamy cytoplasm. The pathogenesis of SGc remains poorly understood. The majority of SGc are solitary and sporadic and believed to be associated with such factors as ultraviolet exposure, radiotherapy, and immunosuppression. Other SGc including those occurring outside of the head and neck region and the presentation of multiple at a time are believed to be associated with genetic defects including defects in mismatch repair genes, Muir–Torre syndrome (MTS), and familial retinoblastoma.

The observation of extraocular SGc arising from Bowen disease or actinic keratosis and the predisposition of SGc to arise in sun-exposed areas suggest a role for ultraviolet exposure or intraepidermal neoplasia in the pathogenesis of some SGc in sun-exposed areas. While there are markedly increased rates of cutaneous neoplasms in solid organ transplant recipients, there is evidence to suggest that solid organ transplantation may increase the risk of SGc up to 90 times. Others have observed a significantly increased risk of SGc in patients with AIDS, suggesting some role for immunosuppression. Reports have also shown the onset of SGc within the field of irradiation for patients undergoing radiotherapy for retinoblastoma, eczema, or cosmetic epilation. There are cases reported of SGc arising from nevus sebaceus.

MTS is an autosomal dominant cancer syndrome characterized by multiple sebaceous and visceral neoplasms, the most common being colorectal adenocarcinoma. MTS results from defects in DNA mismatch repair genes, MLH1, MSH2, and MSH6, leading to a buildup of unstable microsatellite sequences and replication errors predisposing to various malignancies. Patients with MTS may present with numerous sebaceous tumors at a younger age (mean age of 53 years) and in atypical locations, including extraocular. The incidence of MTS in patients with sebaceous neoplasms is as high as 14 to 50%.

Besides mutations in mismatch repair genes, Wnt/beta-catenin signaling is known to be altered and plays a significant role in the development of sebaceous tumors. Altered expression of beta-catenin, p21, sonic hedgehog signaling (Shh), and E-cadherin has been associated with invasion, metastasis, and poor clinical outcomes. More recently, mutations in tumor suppressor genes including p53 and Rb have been associated with the development of sporadic SGc as well as SGc in MTS patients with intact mismatch repair and subsets of younger patients presenting with SGc harboring transcriptionally active high-risk human papillomavirus (HPV).

== Diagnosis ==
Due to the variable clinical and histological appearance of SGc, they are often misdiagnosed. There is no pathognomonic presentation of SGc, often resulting in a delay of diagnosis of months to years. The average delay in diagnosis has been reported to be 1.0 – 2.9 years from the expected onset of the lesion.

Patients with ocular sebaceous carcinomas present with nonhealing eyelid tumors that are often misdiagnosed for more common benign conditions such as chalazion, blepharitis, conjunctivitis, or other inflammatory conditions. Extraocular SGc frequently appears similarly to skin cancers such as basal cell carcinoma, squamous cell carcinoma and benign lesions such a molluscum contagiosum and pyogenic granuloma. SGc share a similar histological presentation to other cutaneous tumors, such as sebaceous adenomas, basal cell carcinomas (BCC), squamous cell carcinomas (SCC), and clear cell tumors. A high level of suspicion is extremely important to prevent treatment delay and increased mortality.

Given the aggressive growth and pagetoid spread of SGc, a full-thickness biopsy with microscopic examination is required for definitive diagnosis of sebaceous carcinomas. A full thickness biopsy of the eyelid (in suspected periocular SGc) includes the skin, tarsus, and palpebral conjunctiva. Map biopsies, taken from distinct areas of the conjunctiva are recommended in cases exhibiting pagetoid spread in order to determine the extent of disease. Different markers and stains help differentiate sebaceous carcinomas from other cancers. These markers include lipid stains such as oil red O stain and Sudan IV, and immunohistochemical stains.

=== Morphology ===
SGc is classified based on histopathological presentation, including cytoarchitecture, cytology, and pattern of growth. The lobular variant is the most common histological pattern, followed by papillary, comedocarcinoma, and mixed. Tumors may be also classified by differentiation, from poor to well differentiated. Well- and moderately differentiated sebaceous carcinoma tend to exhibit vacuolization within the cytoplasm of the tumor cells. This is known as sebocytic differentiation, where the vacuolization is caused by lipid-containing cytoplasmic vacuoles that present as round, clear areas in the cell. Periocular sebaceous gland carcinoma exhibits pagetoid (intraepithelial) spread, an upward growth of abnormal cells invading the epidermis. It is most often seen in the lid margin and/or conjunctiva. Periorbital SGc also presents with multicentric origins, in the upper and lower eyelids, increasing the risk of local recurrence.

=== Immunohistochemistry ===
Immunohistochemistry may be used to establish a definitive diagnosis, but it is not required with typical histopathological findings. SGc tumor cells stain positive with epithelial membrane antigen (EMA), cytokeratin -7 (CK-7), Ber-EP4, adipophilin, perilipin, and androgen receptor (AR). Meanwhile, SGc cells are negative for carcinoembryonic antigen (CEA), gross cystic disease fluid protein, and S100 protein, helping differentiate SGc from SCC and BCC. Immunohistochemistry may also be used to differentiate SGc from benign growths and certain markers may predict an increased chance of recurrence or metastasis including Ki-67, ALDH1, and AR.

Tissue immunohistochemistry is routinely used in evaluation of SGc to screen for MTS. The absence of staining for DNA mismatch repair MSH2, MSH6, and MLH1 may suggest a diagnosis of MTS and identify patients for further genetic testing. Patients with extraocular SGc and a Mayo MTS risk score greater than or equal to 2 (2 or more sebaceous tumors, age under 60 at presentation of sebaceous carcinoma, family history of any Lynch-related cancers, personal history of any Lynch-related cancers) should undergo genetic testing for MTS.

== Staging ==
Periocular SGc is staged according to the eighth edition of the American Joint Committee on Cancer (AJCC) staging system for eyelid carcinoma since it is primarily an eyelid tumor. No staging criteria exist for extraocular SGc, but the AJCC guidelines for nonmelanoma skin cancer or the eighth edition of the Union for International Cancer Control TNM staging system for skin carcinomas may be used.

=== Sentinel lymph node biopsy ===
Regional nodes are involved in as many as 10 to 28% of periocular SGc. Nodal involvement in extraocular SGc is less well studied. The rate of metastasis is approximately 4.4% for ocular SGc and 1.4% for extraocular SGc. Since periocular tumors have a higher rate of regional metastasis than extraocular tumors, SLNB is currently recommended for SGc stage T2c or higher according to the AJCC guidelines (10–20 mm in greatest dimension and involving the full thickness of the eyelid). SLNB is not routinely recommended for extraocular SGc. Treatment for nodal metastasis confirmed via SLNB involves advanced imaging studies (CT with or without PET scan), followed by removal of the primary tumor and regional lymph nodes, with adjuvant radiotherapy. There has been no evidence of decreased mortality in those who had SLNB identified lymph node involvement. In addition, subsequent risks associated with surgical and radiotherapy may increase morbidity.

== Treatment ==
Local SGc is most commonly managed with local resection and/or radiation therapy. Systemic therapy for metastatic disease is not well described, and may include conventional chemotherapy, targeted therapies (anti-androgen, EGFR inhibitors, and retinoid receptor ligands), and immunotherapy.

=== Surgical resection ===
Wide local excision and Mohs micrographic surgery (MMS) are the mainstay of treatment for both periocular and extraocular. Unlike wide local excision, MMS allows for precise and accurate removal of the tumor and complete assessment of margins. Furthermore, MMS is associated with significantly lower local and distant recurrence rates in both periocular and extraocular SGc, when compared to wide local excision. MMS also limits morbidity and is useful in cosmetically sensitive areas such as the face. According to the MMS appropriate use criteria (AUC), MMC may be considered for SGc in any location, unlike basal cell or squamous cell carcinoma, given the high recurrence rates and potentially aggressive nature of SGc.

=== Radiation therapy ===
Radiotherapy is associated with higher recurrence rates and mortality when compared to surgical excision. It is not recommended as a primary therapy and is only for patients who cannot undergo or refuse surgical excision. Potential adverse effects from radiation include keratitis, conjunctivitis, dry eyes, and loss of vision.

=== Chemotherapy ===
There is a limited amount of information on the effectiveness of chemotherapy for SGc, and it is not indicated for local disease. Few studies have shown topical adjuvant chemotherapy to be effective in treating SGc. Neoadjuvant chemotherapy may be used in advanced tumors to allow for local resection and to avoid highly morbid procedures, such as exenteration.

=== Adjuvant Radiation Therapy ===
Postsurgical adjuvant radiation therapy has been used in locally advanced primary tumors and those with positive margins or perineural invasion. Data on the role of adjuvant radiation therapy in the treatment of SGc is scarce, however, and recurrence following adjuvant radiation therapy has been reported.

== Prognosis ==
Greater survival rates have been observed for ocular versus extraocular tumors and localized versus regional disease. The observed survival rates at 5 and 10 years are 78.20 and 61.72%, respectively, while the relative survival rates at 5 and 10 years are 92.72 and 86.98%, respectively. SGc is believed to spread through the blood and lymphatic system via three mechanisms: tumor growth, multifocal tumor proliferation, and shedding of atypical epithelial cells that subsequently transplant in a distant site.

Due to difficulty in promptly diagnosing SGc, the rate of metastasis and recurrence is relatively high. The rate of metastasis is approximately 4.4% for periocular SGc and 1.4% for extraocular SGc. Periocular SGc frequently causes regional metastases resulting in a mortality rate of approximately 22%. Periocular SGc most commonly metastasizes to regional lymph nodes and rarely the lungs, liver, brain, or bone. Regional nodes are involved in as many as 10 to 28% of periocular SGc. Nodal involvement in extraocular SGc is less well studied. At the time of diagnosis, nearly 25% of tumors will metastasize. In those with metastatic disease, survival decreases to approximately 50% at 5 years. Recurrence rates are higher in periocular vs extraocular tumors (4-37% and 4-29%, respectively). Other features associated with prognosis include tumor differentiation, androgen-receptor staining index, ALDH1 expression, Ki-67 positivity, and PD-1 expression. Poorly or undifferentiated tumors are more likely to have nodal involvement and are associated with higher mortality. Over time, there has been a notable improvement in prognosis in those with SGc, which may be due to earlier recognition and improved treatment modalities.

== See also ==
- Sebaceous adenoma
- Sebaceous hyperplasia
- Sebaceoma
- List of cutaneous neoplasms associated with systemic syndromes
