= Sebaceous hyperplasia =

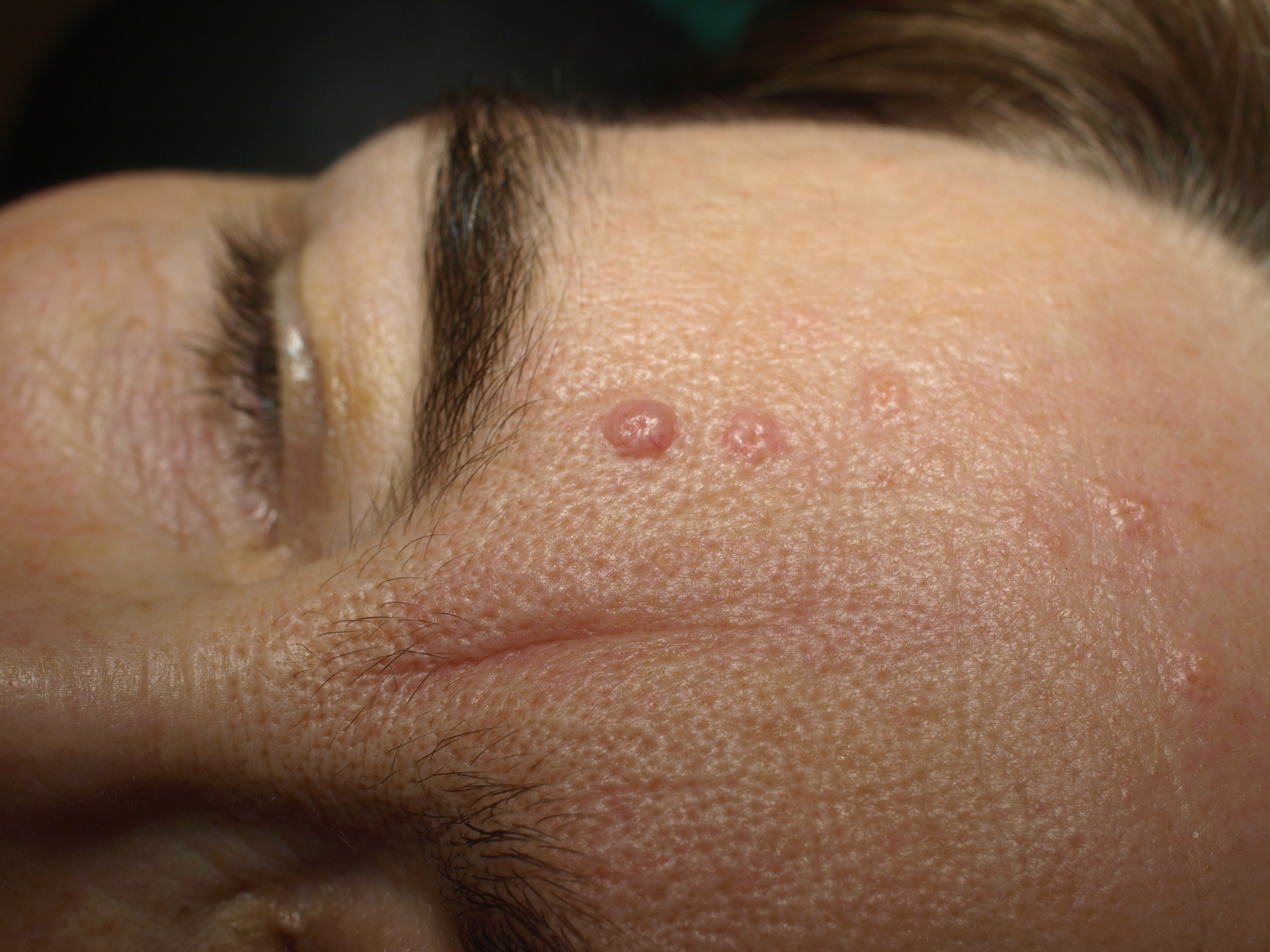
- Sebaceous hyperplasia in 55-year-old woman. Diagnosis was histologically verified.
- Specialty: Dermatology

Sebaceous hyperplasia is a disorder of the sebaceous glands in which they become enlarged, producing flesh-colored or yellowish, shiny, often umbilicated bumps. Sebaceous hyperplasia, primarily affecting older patients in high-concentration areas like the face, head, and neck, typically has a 2-4 mm diameter and causes no symptoms. The lesions are often surrounded by telangiectatic blood vessels, also known as "crown vessels," and a central dell, which is in line with the origin of the lesions.

Sebaceous glands are glands located within the skin and are responsible for secreting an oily substance named sebum. They are commonly associated with hair follicles but they can be found in hairless regions of the skin as well. Their secretion lubricates the skin, protecting it from drying out or becoming irritated.

Studies in mice suggest topical irritants and carcinogens may contribute to sebaceous hyperplasia development, with immunosuppression with cyclosporin A or HIV infection increasing the likelihood.

Sebaceous hyperplasia is a condition that can be diagnosed clinically but requires a biopsy for confirmation. It shares similarities with folliculosebaceous unit architecture but has larger and expanded sebaceous glands. Identifying sebaceous hyperplasia using dermatoscopy can help identify it from other lesions. The dermoscopic characteristics include "crown vessels" clusters of white or yellow nodules, a distinct asymmetrical milky-white structure called the cumulus sign, and a central umbilication called the "bonbon toffee sign."

Sebaceous hyperplasia treatment involves various techniques like cryotherapy, bichloroacetic acid, shave excision, carbon dioxide laser ablation, electrodessication, erbium/yttrium aluminum garnet laser ablation, and pulsed-dye laser photothermolysis.

== Signs and symptoms ==
Sebaceous hyperplasia primarily affects older patients in areas with high concentrations of sebaceous glands, such as the face, head, and neck. It typically manifests as yellowish-colored skin with small papules that are often surrounded by telangiectatic blood vessels, also known as "crown vessels," and a central dell that is in line with the origin of the lesions, which is a dilated central follicular infundibulum. Most lesions have a diameter of 2-4 mm and cause no symptoms.

== Causes ==
Although the etiology is unknown, murine studies have revealed that topical irritants and carcinogens may be involved in the development of sebaceous hyperplasia.

Immunosuppression with cyclosporin A or HIV infection increases the likelihood of developing sebaceous hyperplasia significantly.

== Diagnosis ==
Although sebaceous hyperplasia can be diagnosed clinically, a biopsy is necessary for confirmation in cases of doubt. The differential diagnosis for sebaceous hyperplasia includes nevus sebaceous, sebaceous carcinoma, sebaceous adenoma, basal cell carcinoma, molluscum contagiosum, and small epidermal inclusion cysts.

Sebaceous hyperplasia shares histopathological similarities with the typical architecture of the folliculosebaceous unit, but with larger and expanded sebaceous glands.

To help identify sebaceous hyperplasia from other lesions, dermatoscopy may be utilized. A cluster of white or yellow nodules encircled by tiny, nonarborizing branching vessels known as "crown vessels" are among the dermoscopic characteristics of sebaceous hyperplasia. On dermatoscopy, a distinct asymmetrical milky-white structure known as the cumulus sign has been identified in cases with sebaceous hyperplasia. Unlike the traditional crown vessels, some writers describe the blood vessels as "multiple tree-like branches." A central umbilication encircled by the cumulus sign was another distinguishing characteristic of dermatoscopy; the authors dubbed this the "bonbon toffee sign."

== Treatment ==
There are numerous techniques that have been reported, including cryotherapy, bichloroacetic acid, shave excision, carbon dioxide laser ablation, electrodessication, erbium or yttrium aluminum garnet laser ablation, and pulsed-dye laser photothermolysis.

== Additional photos ==
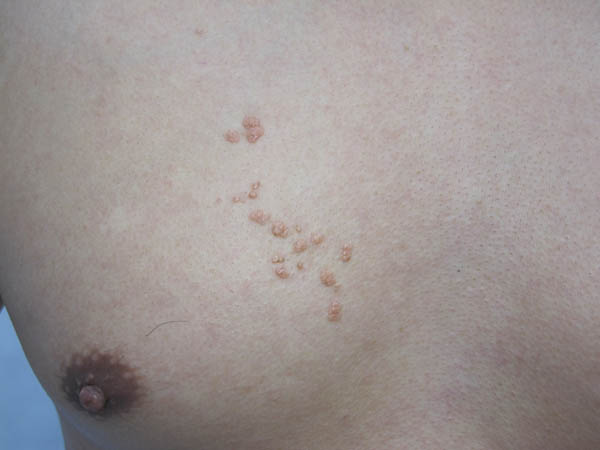
Photography of sebaceous hyperplasia, showing a group of papules, in this case on the chest with linear distribution pattern

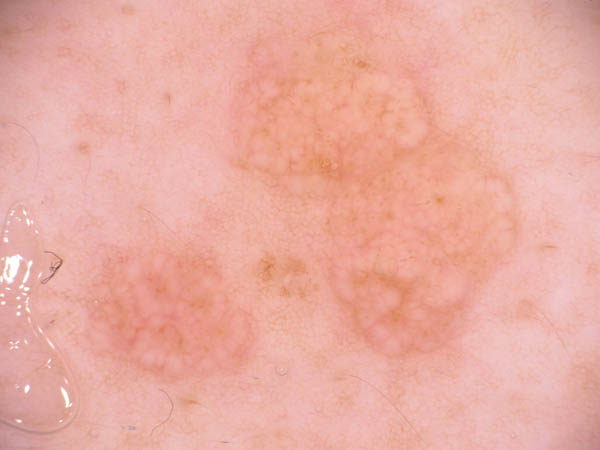
Dermoscopy of sebaceous hyperplasia. Note the aggregation of yellowish-white clods with linear vessels between or above the clods.

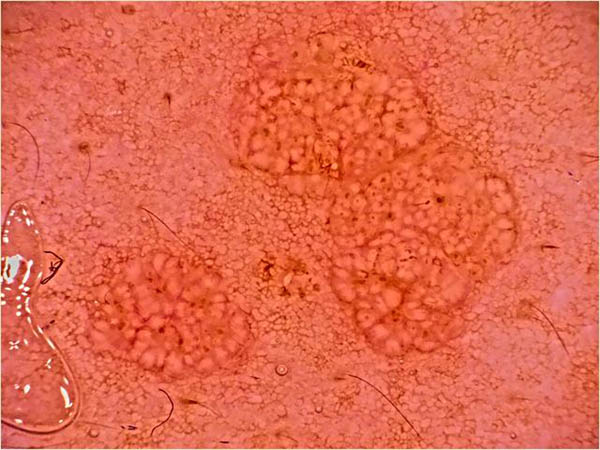
Dermoscopy of sebaceous hyperplasia with digital high dynamic range. Note the multi-lobulated clods with central openings.

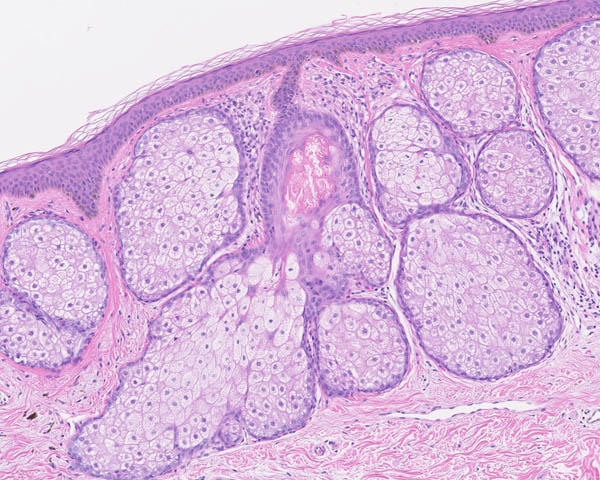
H&E staining of biopsied lesion of sebaceous hyperplasia: Note the multiple, mature sebaceous lobules attached to the central dilated duct in the upper dermis.

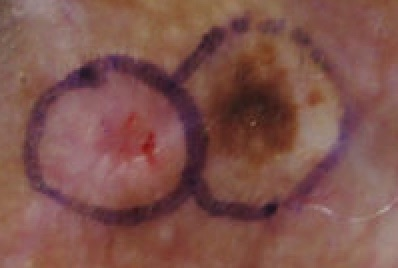
Sebaceous hyperplasia, lateral right temple marked for biopsy with adjacent melanoma in situ, evolving, medial right temple

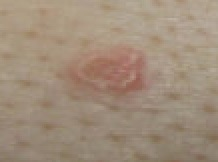
Sebaceous hyperplasia with surrounding chronic folliculitis, right mid chest

== See also ==
- Sebaceous adenoma
- Sebaceous carcinoma
