= John Addison Fordyce =

American dermatologist (1858–1925)

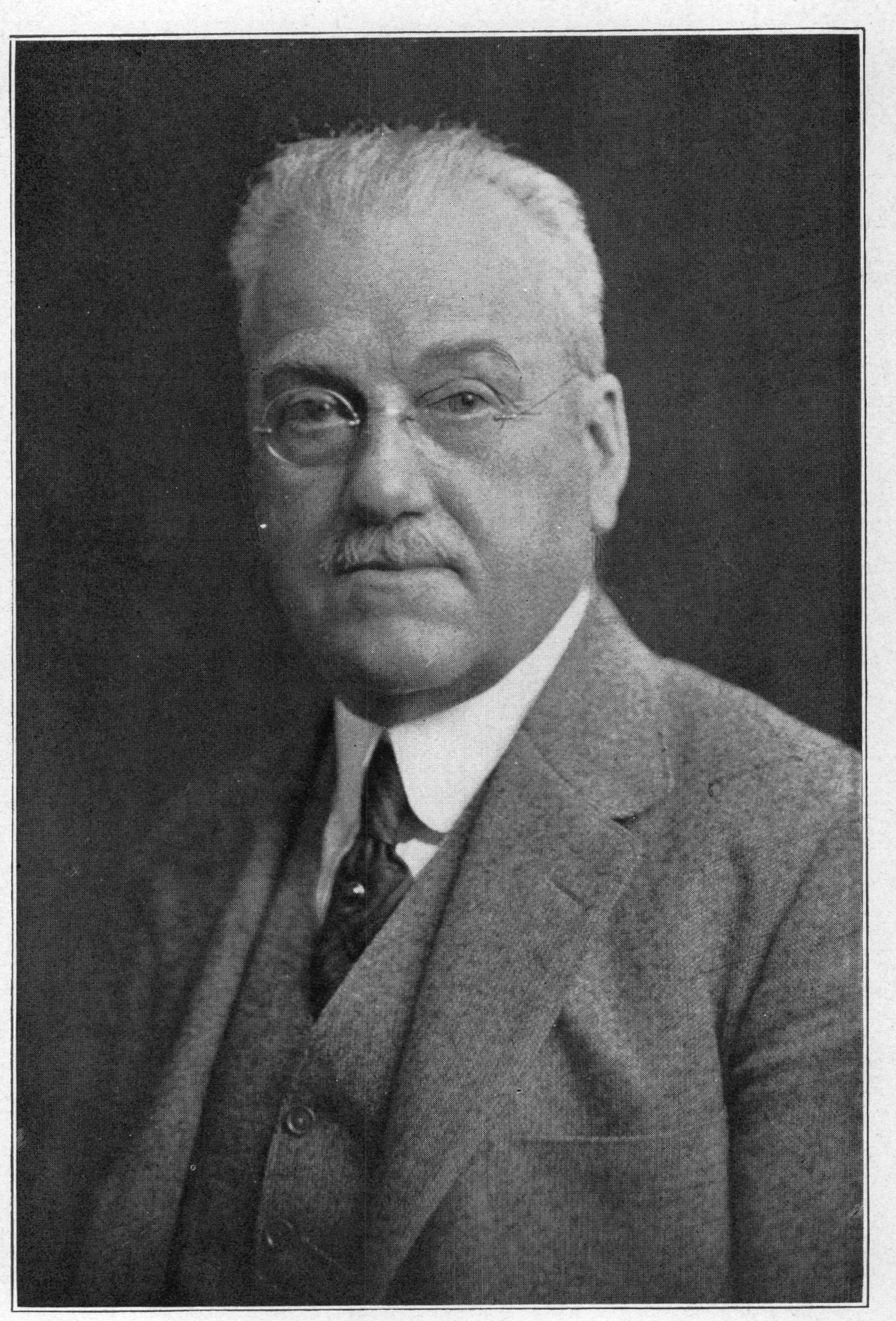
- Born: February 16, 1858
- Died: June 4, 1925 (aged 67)
- Education: Chicago Medical College

John Addison Fordyce (February 16, 1858 – June 4, 1925) was an American professor of dermatology whose name is associated with Fordyce's spot, angiokeratoma of Fordyce, Brooke–Fordyce trichoepithelioma, and Fox–Fordyce disease.

== Early life and education ==
John Addison Fordyce was born on February 16, 1858, in Guernsey County, Ohio. His father John Fordyce was of Scottish ancestry and mother Mary A. Houseman Fordyce of German. He gained his first degree in 1878 and PhD in 1901, both from Adrian College, Adrian.

== Career ==
He graduated in 1881 with a degree in medicine from the Chicago Medical College, and subsequently completed his junior posts at the Cook County Hospital in Chicago. Between 1883 and 1886, he lived at Hot Springs, Ark. Between 1886 and 1888, he was in Vienna, Paris, and Berlin, from where he received his MD. In Vienna, he studied dermatology with Moritz Kaposi. In Paris he studied under Jean Alfred Fournier, Émile Vidal and Ernest Besnier.

He returned to the States and settled down in New York, where he was a specialist in dermatology and syphilis. From 1889 to 1893, he taught at the New York Polyclinic, and later he served as a professor at the Bellevue Hospital Medical College and the Columbia University College of Physicians and Surgeons.

In 1896, he reported on small bumps in the mouth, which he described as a disease. These came to be referred to as Fordyce spots and were found to be only normal sebaceous glands.

== Death and legacy ==
He died on June 4, 1925, in New York. His name is associated with Fordyce's spot, angiokeratoma of Fordyce, Brooke–Fordyce trichoepithelioma, and Fox–Fordyce disease.

== Selected publications ==
- Fordyce, J. A. (1 November 1896). "A peculiar affection of the mucous membrane of the lips and oral cavity" (PDF). Archives of Dermatology. 132 (11): 1285. doi:10.1001/archderm.1996.03890350023003.
