= John Fordyce (priest) =

John Fordyce (died 1751) was a Church of England priest who was ordained in Pembrokeshire, Wales. Fordyce was posted to St John's, Newfoundland, where he appears to have had a fractious relationship with the residents after an initial warm welcome. In 1735, Fordyce asked for a transfer to South Carolina as a missionary. In 1736, he occupied his new parish of Prince Frederick, South Carolina.
