= Sebaceous adenoma =

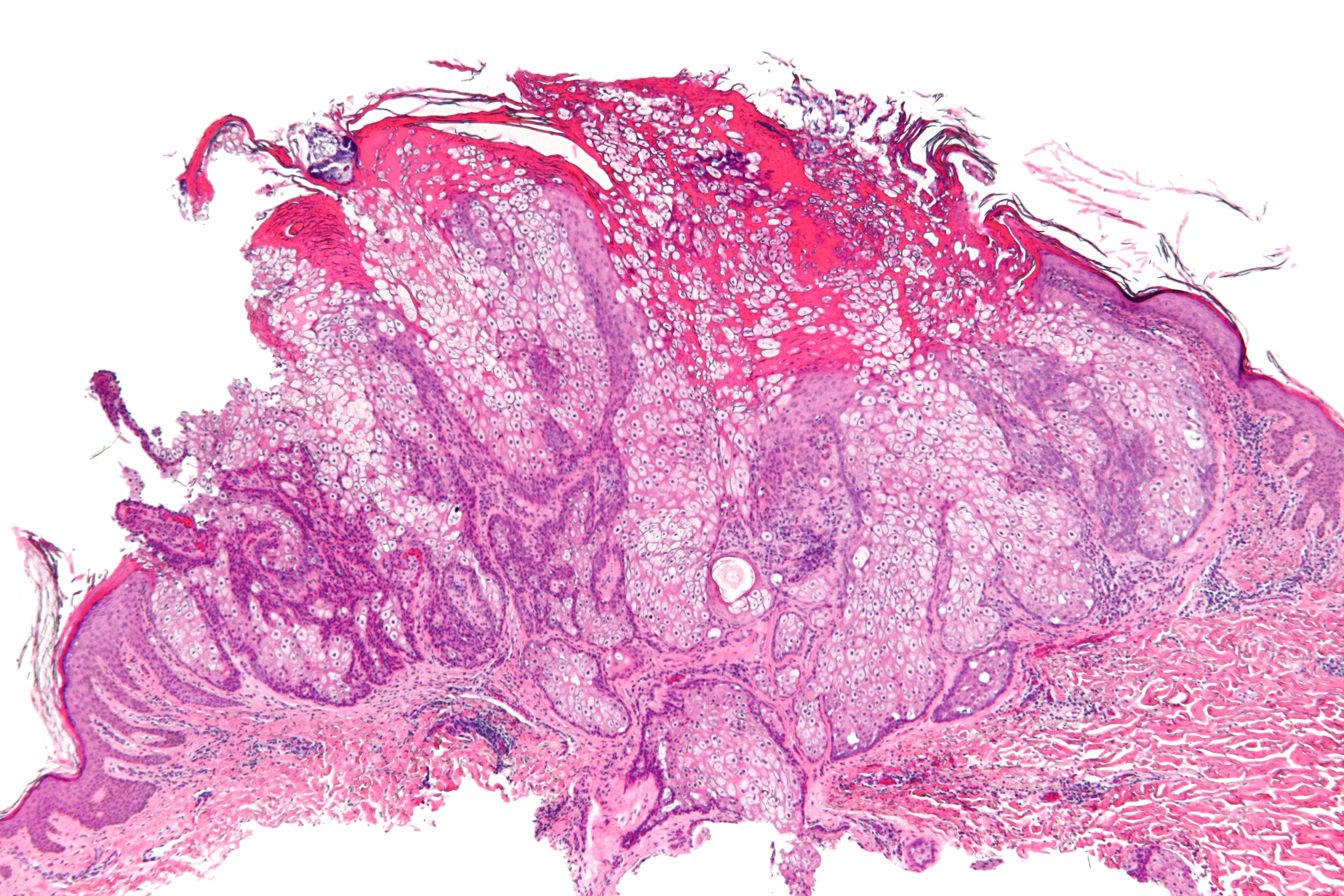
- Micrograph of a sebaceous adenoma. H&E stain.
- Specialty: Dermatology

Sebaceous adenoma is a type of adenoma, characterized by a slow-growing tumor usually presenting as a pink, flesh-coloured, or yellow papule or nodule.

== Significance ==
Sebaceous adenomas, in isolation, are not significant; however, they may be associated with Muir-Torre syndrome, a genetic condition that predisposes individuals to cancer. It is also linked to hereditary nonpolyposis colorectal cancer (Lynch syndrome).

It is not the same as "adenoma sebaceum" by F. Balzer and P.E. Ménétrier (1885). The term "adenoma sebaceum" is a misnomer for facial angiofibromas associated with tuberous sclerosis complex.

== See also ==
- Sebaceous carcinoma
- Sebaceous hyperplasia
- List of cutaneous conditions
- List of cutaneous neoplasms associated with systemic syndromes
