= DNA curtain =

Single-molecule imaging technique

DNA curtain is a single-molecule imaging technique used to visualize protein–DNA interactions in real time with high-throughput. This method arranges long double-stranded or single-stranded DNA molecules on a supported lipid bilayer within a microfluidic chamber, where hydrodynamic flow aligns them against nanofabricated diffusion barriers. Traditional single-molecule techniques typically observe one molecule at a time, which limits throughput. In contrast, DNA curtains allow hundreds to thousands of DNA molecules to be monitored simultaneously using total internal reflection fluorescence microscope (TIRFM). This high-throughput capability enables direct observation of how proteins interact with DNA, translocate along it, and search for target sequences.

== History ==
The DNA curtains technique was first introduced by Eric C. Greene and colleagues at Columbia University. Early methods used supported lipid bilayers and nanofabricated diffusion barriers to align long DNA molecules into parallel arrays for high-throughput single-molecule imaging. Subsequent work incorporated nanoscale diffusion barriers, and Greene’s group later standardized DNA curtain protocols for TIRFM. During this period, double-tethered DNA curtains were developed, allowing DNA molecules to remain extended without continuous buffer flow. In 2012, single-stranded DNA curtains were introduced, extending the technique to ssDNA substrates. In 2015, Gallardo at Cornell University introduced a photolithography-based method for large-scale fabrication of chromium diffusion barriers, allowing the assembly of hundreds of DNA arrays within a single flow cell for high-throughput single-molecule studies. In 2021, Kopuštas and co-workers introduced Soft DNA Curtains, a lithography-free method.

DNA curtains have continuously evolved through improvements in nanofabrication, surface patterning, and tethering strategies. The technique has become a widely used high-throughput platform for observing DNA–protein interactions across diverse biological systems.

== Principles ==
=== Flow cell assembly ===
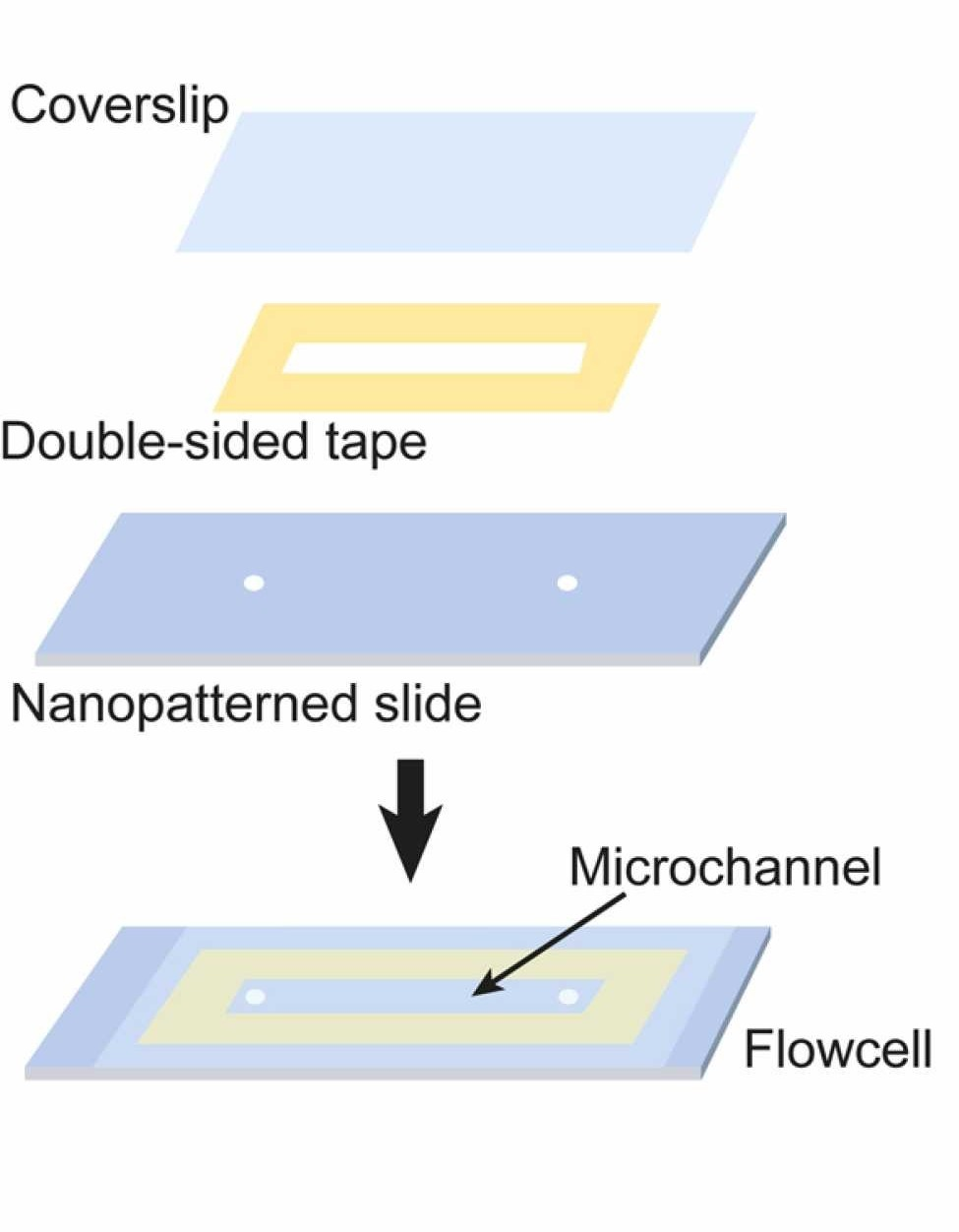
Schematic of a flow cell assembly

DNA curtain experiment typically begins with the assembly of a microfluidic flow cell composed of a fused-silica slide and a borosilicate glass coverslip. A narrow channel is formed between the two surfaces using double-sided adhesive tape, which creates the internal chamber for buffer and sample exchange. Inlet and outlet ports are glued over the drilled holes in the flow cell, and syringes are attached to these ports to support bilayer deposition. This configuration creates a stable, sealed, and optically clear microfluidic environment that is well suited for supported lipid bilayer formation, DNA tethering, and regulated buffer flow.

=== Diffusion barriers ===
Diffusion barriers play an important role in the DNA curtains technique by organizing lipid-tethered DNA molecules into orderly arrays, stopping each strand at one end as it diffuses across the membrane. The barrier patterns can be designed in various shapes depending on the experimental requirements. Early versions included scratched quartz barriers, later replaced by chromium-based diffusion barriers. Zig-zag designs became standard because they prevent lateral diffusion. Discontinuous patterns were later introduced to improve the ability to distinguish individual DNA molecules, particularly at higher DNA densities. Regardless of design, the barriers function to halt the lateral diffusion of DNA within the supported lipid bilayer. Under hydrodynamic flow, tethered DNA migrates until it encounters the barrier, where it becomes trapped and extended. By controlling DNA concentration, individual molecules can be isolated within each barrier feature.

=== Lipid bilayer formation ===
Supported lipid bilayers (SLBs) provide a passivated and fluid surface for organizing tethered DNA molecules. The bilayer is typically formed by adsorbing vesicles onto the glass flow cell surface. It creates a membrane-like layer that minimizes nonspecific adsorption of proteins and nucleic acids. Biotinylated DNA is attached to the SLB through biotin–streptavidin binding and can diffuse laterally within the two-dimensional lipid layer while remaining close to the surface for imaging. Under hydrodynamic flow, the tethered DNA moves across the bilayer until it reaches a diffusion barrier, where it becomes aligned and extended. These properties of SLBs make it versatile and effective platform for organizing DNA molecules in real-time single-molecule experiments.

=== DNA tethering ===
DNA molecules are anchored to a supported lipid bilayer for controlled imaging and observation. In DNA curtains, both double-stranded DNA (dsDNA) and single-stranded DNA (ssDNA) can be used. Lambda phage DNA is commonly used as a dsDNA substrate because it is commercially available and contains regions with varying adenine-thymine (AT) content, allowing studies of sequence-dependent protein binding. For ssDNA curtains, long single-stranded molecules are produced via rolling circle replication. Tethered DNA remains near the surface and diffuses within the lipid bilayer, facilitating alignment at diffusion barriers. This enables real-time observation of protein–DNA interactions.

=== Visualization ===
Visualization of proteins in DNA curtains experiments is achieved by labeling them with an inorganic dye, attaching quantum dots, or creating a fusion protein that links the protein of interest to a fluorescent tag. DNA curtains containing dsDNA are visualized using intercalating dyes such as YOYO-1, while curtains containing ssDNA are typically visualized using replication protein A–eGFP. Once the DNA curtains are formed, the labeled proteins are introduced into the microfluidic flow cell and both proteins and DNA molecules are simultaneously imaged with TIRFM. This method allows for direct, time-resolved observation of protein–DNA interactions, including diffusion, binding events, and target search processes.

=== Imaging ===
Total internal reflection fluorescence microscopy (TIRFM) is widely used in DNA curtain experiments to visualize fluorescently labeled DNA molecules and their associated proteins at single-molecule resolution. In TIRFM, a laser beam is directed through a microscope slide and reflected at an angle exceeding the critical angle, generating an evanescent electromagnetic wave at the interface between the slide and the aqueous buffer. This wave penetrates a few hundred nanometers into the sample, producing a highly restricted excitation volume that significantly reduces background fluorescence. DNA curtain assays commonly use prism-based TIRFM. This optical configuration enables real-time imaging of nanofabricated DNA arrays and supports detailed analysis of protein–DNA interactions under physiologically relevant conditions.

== Procedure ==
In DNA curtains, the surface of a flow cell is coated with a supported lipid bilayer (SLB), with a small fraction of lipids functionalized with biotin. The bilayer is then treated with neutravidin or streptavidin, which allows biotin-labeled DNA molecules to attach. Because the lipid bilayer is fluid, the DNA can move freely in two dimensions. When a hydrodynamic flow is applied, the DNA is directed toward lipid diffusion barriers on the surface. These barriers, positioned perpendicular to the flow, prevent lateral movement of the lipids, causing the DNA to accumulate along the leading edges of the barriers. Under continuous flow, hundreds or even thousands of DNA molecules align in parallel and stretch across the surface. This arrangement enables high-resolution imaging of DNA using total internal reflection fluorescence microscopy (TIRFM).

== Types of DNA Curtains ==
=== Conventional DNA curtains ===
==== Single-tethered DNA curtains ====
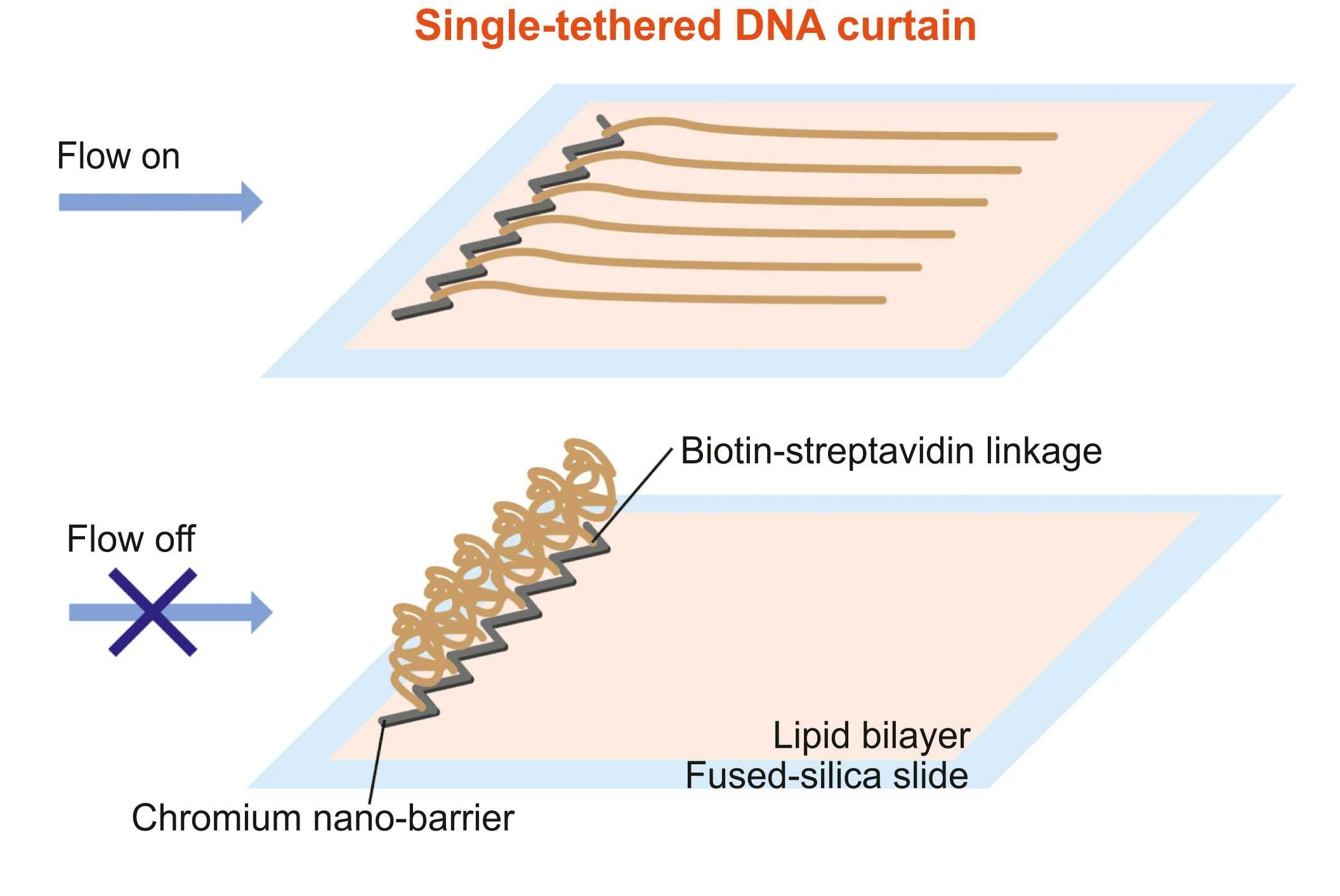
Schematic of a single-tethered DNA curtain

This is the earliest and simplest configuration used in DNA curtain experiments. In single-tethered curtains, each DNA molecule is attached by one end to a supported lipid bilayer through a biotin–streptavidin linkage, while the rest of the DNA extends freely into the solution. Because each molecule is anchored only at one end, continuous flow is required to maintain extension. When the flow is stopped, the DNA recoils and diffuses away from the surface. The main advantages of this configuration are its simplicity and rapid assembly, making it well-suited for experiments examining binding and dissociation kinetics, such as transient protein–DNA interactions under applied tension.

==== Double-tethered DNA Curtains ====
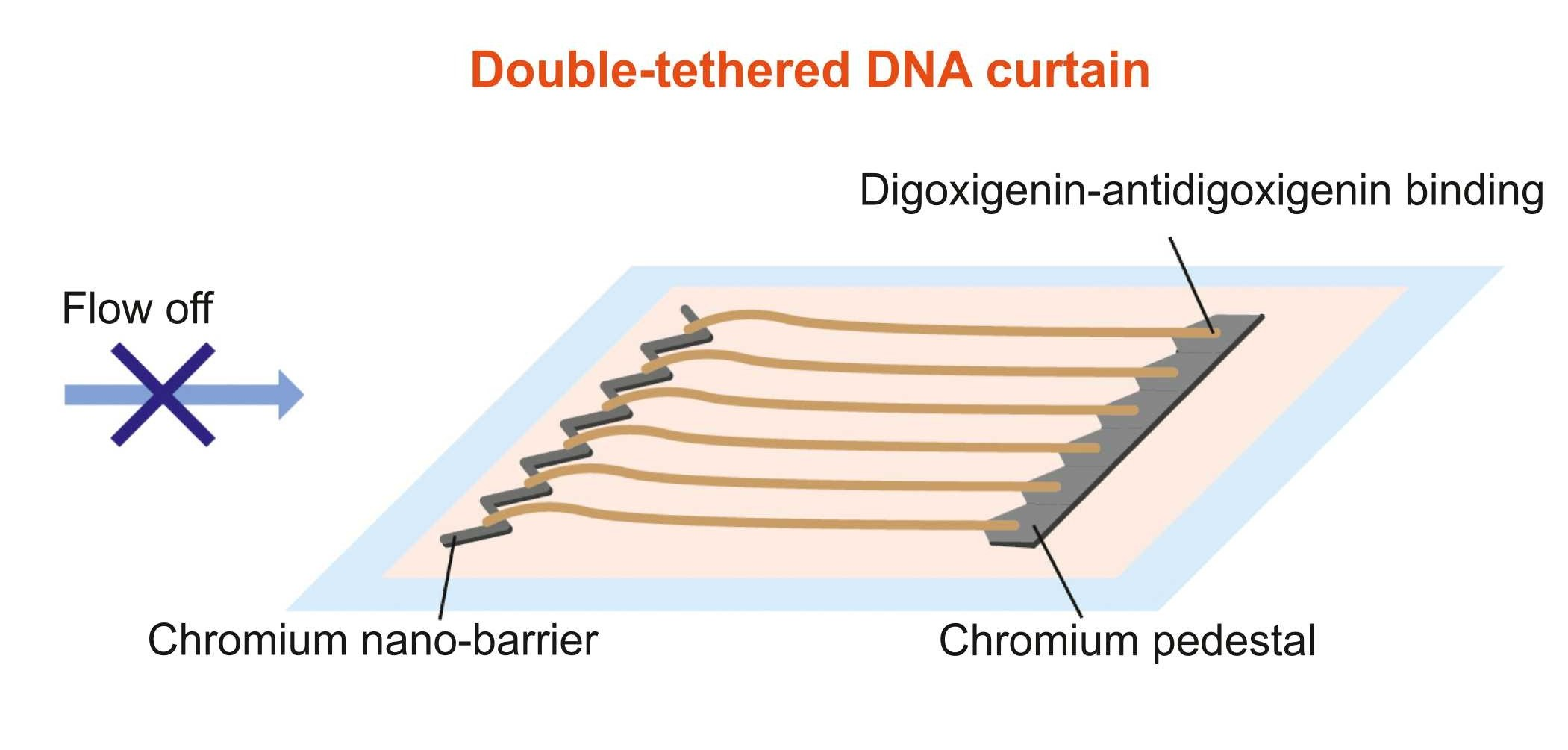
Schematic of a double-tethered DNA curtain

This configuration was developed to overcome the limitation of continuous buffer flow required in single-tethered DNA curtains. In double-tethered curtains, both ends of each DNA molecule are attached to the surface, typically one end to a supported lipid bilayer through a biotin–streptavidin linkage, and the other end is anchored to a fixed pedestal coated with anti-digoxigenin antibodies that bind to a digoxigenin (DIG) tag on the DNA. Once both ends are anchored, the DNA remains stretched and visible even when the buffer flow is stopped, allowing the entire DNA length to be imaged without hydrodynamic tension. This feature is particularly useful for experiments that require flow-free observation, such as those involving costly reagents or proteins sensitive to shear forces.

=== Single-stranded DNA Curtains ===
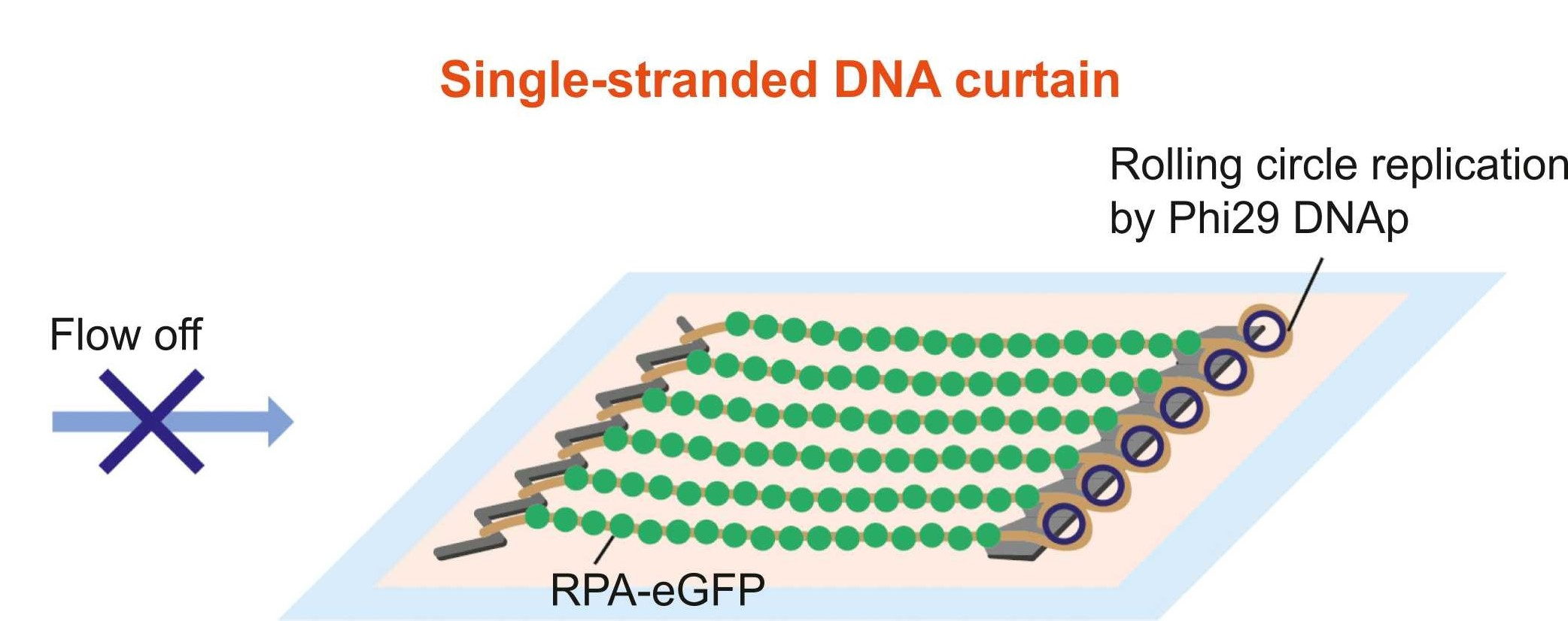
Schematic of a single-stranded DNA (ssDNA) curtain

ssDNA curtains are a specialized configuration of the DNA curtain platform designed for visualizing long single-stranded DNA (ssDNA) molecules at the single-molecule level. Long ssDNA substrates are generated by rolling circle replication. The resulting ssDNA molecules are anchored to a supported lipid bilayer through biotin–streptavidin linkages, leaving the rest of each molecule free in solution. ssDNA curtains have been applied to study numerous DNA-processing proteins and complexes. This method has provided key insights into the mechanisms of presynaptic complex assembly, filament remodeling, homology search, and regulation of recombination intermediates.

=== Spatially patterned DNA curtains ===
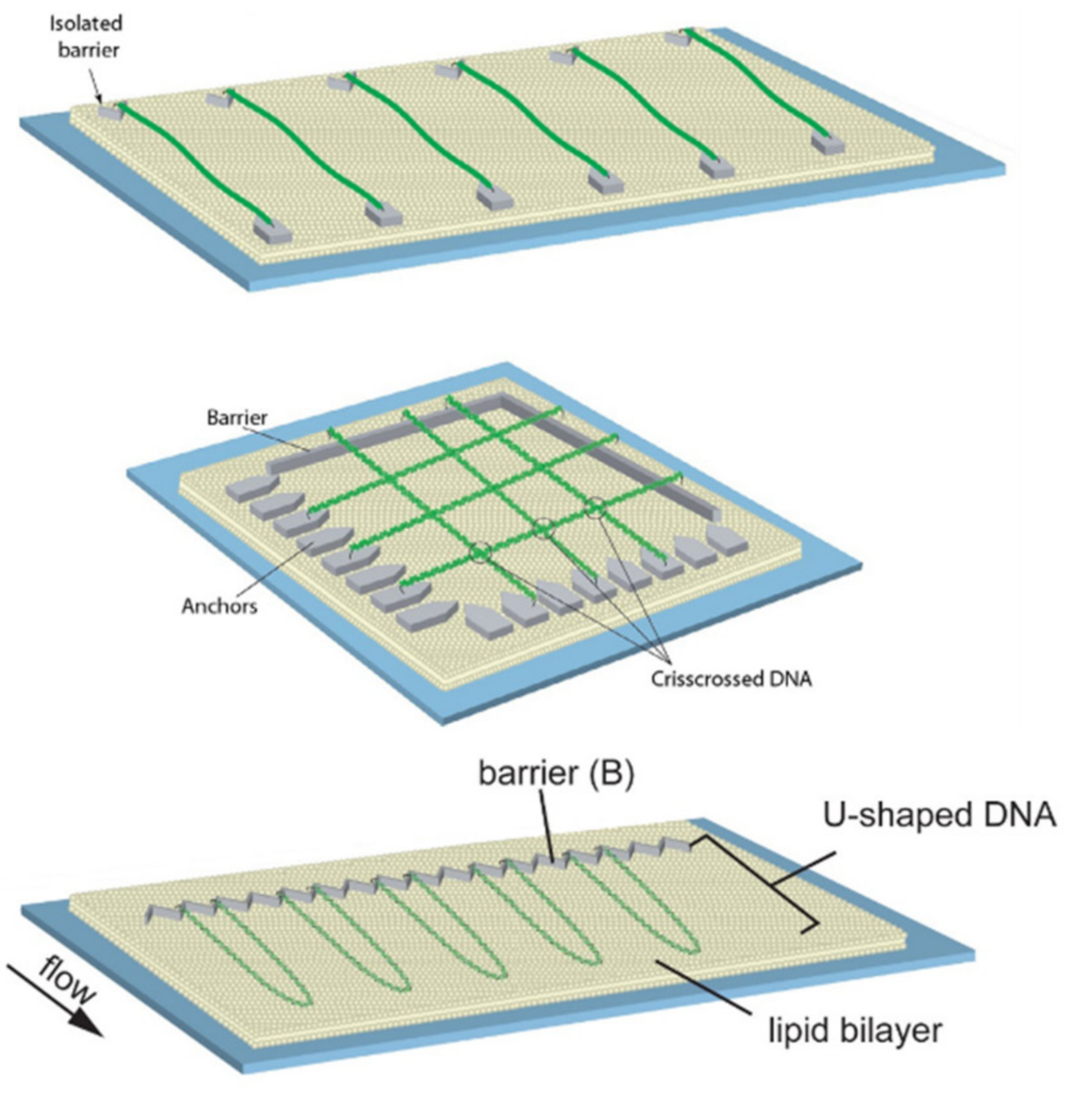
Schematic of spatially patterned DNA curtains. Parallel array of double-tethered isolated DNA curtains (top), crisscrossed DNA curtains (middle), U-shaped DNA curtains (bottom).

==== Parallel array of double-tethered isolated DNA curtains ====
Parallel Array of Double-Tethered Isolated (PARDI) patterns are microfabricated structures used to produce sparsely arranged DNA curtains for single-molecule studies. This configuration minimizes interactions between neighboring strands and maintains a low local DNA concentration. The large spacing between molecules reduces steric and kinetic interference, enabling direct observation of individual protein binding events. Thus, this configuration is well suited for studying protein–DNA interactions, particularly protein association kinetics, under conditions with controlled, low DNA concentration.

==== Crisscrossed DNA curtains ====
Crisscrossed DNA curtains are a specialized arrangement of double-tethered DNA molecules designed to generate controlled regions of locally high DNA concentration. In this configuration, individual DNA strands are organized so that they intersect at approximately 90° angles. Crisscrossed DNA curtains have been used to study how proteins move between two closely spaced DNA substrates, providing a controlled system for studying inter-DNA transfer and dynamic protein exchange.

==== U-shaped DNA curtains ====
U-shaped DNA curtains represent a more complex configuration in which both ends of individual DNA molecules are initially immobilized on a supported lipid bilayer through biotin–streptavidin linkages. When hydrodynamic buffer flow is applied, the DNA bends into a “U” shape, and the double-tethered molecules align along zigzag barriers that restrict lipid diffusion. U-shaped curtains are especially useful for studying DNA compaction mechanisms.

=== Advanced DNA curtains ===
==== Suspended DNA curtains ====
In this configuration individual DNA molecules are initially tethered to an elevated gold nanowire spanning a microfluidic flow cell through biotin–streptavidin linkages. When buffer flow is applied, the DNA molecules are stretched along the nanowire and remain suspended above the surface, minimizing non-specific interactions with the flow cell. This arrangement enables visualization of DNA-bound proteins under lower flow rates.

==== Soft DNA curtains ====
Soft DNA curtains protein line-features are patterned on a glass surface, and streptavidin lines serve as stable anchor points for biotinylated DNA molecules, aligning them along the surface. This configuration enables high-throughput imaging of individual DNA molecules and facilitates studies of protein–DNA interactions, while remaining cost-effective, versatile, and accessible to users with minimal prior experience.

== Applications ==
The main application of DNA curtains is to visualize protein–DNA interactions at the single-molecule level. This method is used to study how proteins bind to DNA, search for specific targets, and move along the DNA strand.

=== Binding site preferences ===
DNA curtains allow real-time visualization of protein-DNA interactions and the determination of binding site preferences. Studies showed that mismatch repair proteins, such as MutSα and MutLα, preferentially bind DNA lesions, while RNA polymerase selectively occupies promoter sequences over non promoter regions. This allows mapping of DNA-binding sites, tracking protein lifetimes, and observing protein–DNA interactions in real time.

=== Target search mechanisms ===
DNA curtains have been used to study how DNA binding proteins locate their target sequences. By using real-time visualization of individual molecules, this method finds diffusion-based search strategies such as one-dimensional (1D) sliding, 1D hopping, intersegmental transfer, and three-dimensional (3D) diffusion. Studies showed MutSα primarily uses 1D sliding, while MutLα can hop and bypass nucleosomes. RNA polymerase mainly relies on 3D diffusion with limited short-range facilitated diffusion. This helps to understand how proteins use dynamic and mechanistic strategies to efficiently locate their targets.

=== Protein-protein colocalization ===
DNA curtains are used to study the colocalization of multiple proteins on DNA. By labeling different proteins with distinct quantum dots, it is possible to directly observe the sequential binding of proteins at specific DNA sites. For example, in mismatch repair studies MutSα and MutLα are labelled with different quantum dots to monitor their interactions in real time. MutSα first recognizes and binds to a DNA mismatch, after that MutLα is recruited to the same lesion. This approach visualizes the formation and dynamics of protein complexes on DNA in real time.

=== ATP hydrolysis-driven DNA translocation ===
DNA curtains are used to study ATP-driven motor proteins by tracking their movement in real time. Studies used fluorescently labeled DNA translocases such as RecBCD and FtsK and tracked in real-time as they moved along the DNA substrate. RecBCD rapidly travels along DNA and degrades DNA while removing other proteins from DNA, whereas FtsK moves at extremely high speeds without degrading the substrate. This shows how motor proteins convert chemical energy into directional movement along DNA.

=== Beyond nucleic acids ===
DNA curtains can be used to visualize biological systems that do not involve DNA by modifying the assay to anchor proteins that regulate filament growth. For example, in actin filament formation studies, formin proteins are biotinylated and attached to a supported lipid bilayer, acting as nucleation sites for filament growth. When fluorescent actin monomers are introduced and a buffer flow is applied, these anchored formins guide the assembly of actin filaments along diffusion barriers, creating structured called "actin curtains." This approach allows for real–time visualization of actin polymerization and provides a useful platform for studying protein–actin interactions.

== Advantages ==
The DNA curtains method provides several advantages over traditional single-molecule techniques. Unlike most methods which observe one molecule at a time, DNA curtains enable the simultaneous imaging of hundreds or even thousands of DNA molecules, allowing high-throughput analysis. This method is specifically designed to work with long DNA strands, unlike techniques such as single-molecule FRET or pull-down methods, which typically work only with short DNA strands. This allows for the study of biological processes that occur across larger regions of the genome. DNA curtains offer a practical solution to a common issue of nonspecific surface binding by using diffusion barriers that separate proteins bound to DNA from those nonspecifically adsorbed to the surface. Moreover, DNA curtains directly visualize individual protein–DNA interactions and track protein movement along DNA in real time. This reveals important behaviors such as binding kinetics, translocation, and target searching mechanisms. Furthermore, DNA curtains can be modified into different configurations and work with a variety of DNA types, such as dsDNA and ssDNA.

== Limitations ==
DNA-curtain techniques are highly effective for conducting single-molecule studies. However, they have several limitations depending on the specific approach used. Traditional DNA curtains face several technical challenges, especially in creating effective lipid diffusion barriers. This process often requires specialized knowledge and expensive equipment. Additionally, these systems are susceptible to stability issues and defects during the preparation of supported lipid bilayers. On the other hand, suspended DNA curtains face challenges due to their low throughput and the significant overlap of individual DNA molecules on nanowires. This overlap makes imaging and analysis more complex. Additionally, Soft DNA curtains can be significantly affected by the non-specific binding of DNA-binding proteins to the protein-nanopatterned glass surface. This unwanted interaction can complicate the measurement of protein-DNA interactions, leading to inaccurate results. Furthermore, the standard in vitro buffers used in DNA-curtain experiments do not accurately replicate the crowded biochemical environment present in living cells.

== Recent Advances ==
Recent advances in DNA curtain-based single-molecule assays include the development of chromatin curtains, which enable direct visualization of nucleosome–protein interactions. Also, this method has been extended beyond DNA substrates through the development of actin filament curtains, enabling visualization of cytoskeletal protein assembly at the single-molecule level. Furthermore, UV lithography has been introduced as a more accessible and scalable method for fabricating lipid diffusion barriers. This development makes it easier and more efficient to construct DNA curtains. Another advancement is the introduction of multichannel flow cells, which facilitate ATP titration experiments within a single experimental setup.These flow cells simplify the process and enhance the ability to conduct multiple tests simultaneously. Another important advancement is the use of cell-derived extracts to mimic the crowded intracellular environment in vitro. This strategy more accurately reflects physiological conditions. Therefore, this method has enabled more realistic single-molecule studies, such as DNA replication using Xenopus cell-free extracts and spliceosome assembly using whole-cell extracts.

== See also ==
- Single-molecule experiment
- Optical tweezers
- Single molecule FRET
- Total internal reflection fluorescence microscopy
- Chromosome combing
- DNA nanotechnology
