= Collimator =

Device that narrows or straightens a beam of particles or waves

Example of a particle collimator

A collimator is a device which narrows a beam of particles or waves. "To narrow" can mean either to cause the directions of motion to become more aligned in a specific direction (i.e., make collimated light or parallel rays), or to cause the spatial cross section of the beam to become smaller (beam limiting device).

== History ==
The English physicist Henry Kater was the inventor of the floating collimator, which rendered a great service to practical astronomy. He reported about his invention in January 1825. In his report, Kater mentioned previous work in this area by Carl Friedrich Gauss and Friedrich Bessel.

== Optical collimators ==
An example of an optical collimator with a bulb, an aperture (A), and a plano-convex lens (L)

In optics, a collimator may consist of a curved mirror or lens with some type of light source and/or an image at its focus. This can be used to replicate a target focused at infinity with little or no parallax.

In lighting, collimators are typically designed using the principles of nonimaging optics.

Optical collimators can be used to calibrate other optical devices, to check if all elements are aligned on the optical axis, to set elements at proper focus, or to align two or more devices such as binoculars or gun barrels and gunsights. A surveying camera may be collimated by setting its fiduciary markers so that they define the principal point, as in photogrammetry.

Optical collimators are also used as gun sights. Such sights are called collimator sights and consist of a simple optical collimator with a cross hair or some other reticle at its focus. The viewer only sees an image of the reticle. A viewer can use an optical collimator in three ways: either with both eyes open and one eye looking into the collimator sight; with one eye open and moving the head to alternately see the sight and the target; or with one eye to partially see the sight and target at the same time. Adding a beam splitter creates a reflector sight, allowing the viewer to see the reticle and the field of view simultaneously.

Collimators may be used with laser diodes and CO_{2} cutting lasers. Proper collimation of a laser source with long enough coherence length can be verified with a shearing interferometer.

== X-ray, gamma ray, and neutron collimators ==
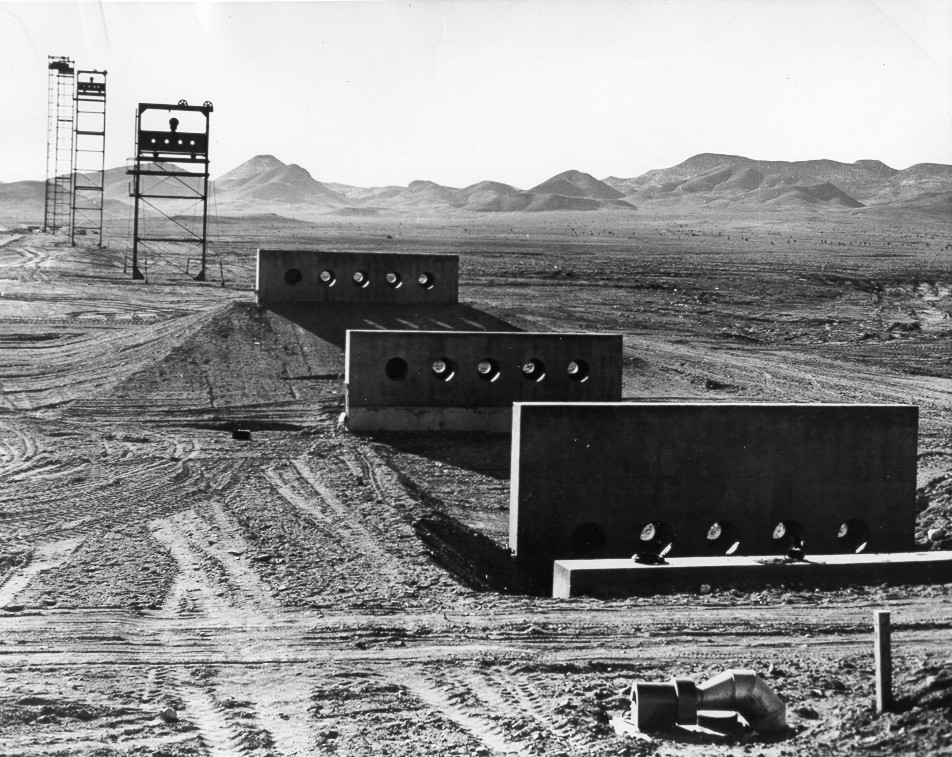
Collimators used to record gamma rays and neutrons from a nuclear test.

In X-ray optics, gamma ray optics, and neutron optics, a collimator is a device that filters a stream of rays so that only those traveling parallel to a specified direction are allowed through. Collimators are used for X-ray, gamma-ray, and neutron imaging because it is difficult to focus these types of radiation into an image using lenses, as is routine with electromagnetic radiation at optical or near-optical wavelengths. Collimators are also used in radiation detectors in nuclear power stations to make them directionally sensitive.

=== Applications ===
How a Söller collimator filters a stream of rays. Top: without a collimator. Bottom: with a collimator.

The figure to the right illustrates how a Söller collimator is used in neutron and X-ray machines. The upper panel shows a situation where a collimator is not used, while the lower panel introduces a collimator. In both panels the source of radiation is to the right, and the image is recorded on the gray plate at the left of the panels.

Without a collimator, rays from all directions will be recorded; for example, a ray that has passed through the top of the specimen (to the right of the diagram) but happens to be travelling in a downwards direction may be recorded at the bottom of the plate. The resultant image will be so blurred and indistinct as to be useless.

In the lower panel of the figure, a collimator has been added (blue bars). This may be a sheet of lead or other material opaque to the incoming radiation with many tiny holes bored through it or in the case of neutrons it can be a sandwich arrangement (which can be up to several feet long; see ENGIN-X) with many layers alternating between neutron absorbing material (e.g., gadolinium) with neutron transmitting material. This can be something simple, such as air; alternatively, if mechanical strength is needed, a material such as aluminium may be used. If this forms part of a rotating assembly, the sandwich may be curved. This allows energy selection in addition to collimation; the curvature of the collimator and its rotation will present a straight path only to one energy of neutrons. Only rays that are travelling nearly parallel to the holes will pass through them—any others will be absorbed by hitting the plate surface or the side of a hole. This ensures that rays are recorded in their proper place on the plate, producing a clear image.

For industrial radiography using gamma radiation sources such as iridium-192 or cobalt-60, a collimator (beam limiting device) allows the radiographer to control the exposure of radiation to expose a film and create a radiograph, to inspect materials for defects. A collimator in this instance is most commonly made of tungsten, and is rated according to how many half value layers it contains, i.e., how many times it reduces undesirable radiation by half. For instance, the thinnest walls on the sides of a 4 HVL tungsten collimator 13 mm (0.52 in) thick will reduce the intensity of radiation passing through them by 88.5%. The shape of these collimators allows emitted radiation to travel freely toward the specimen and the x-ray film, while blocking most of the radiation that is emitted in undesirable directions such as toward workers.

=== Limitations ===
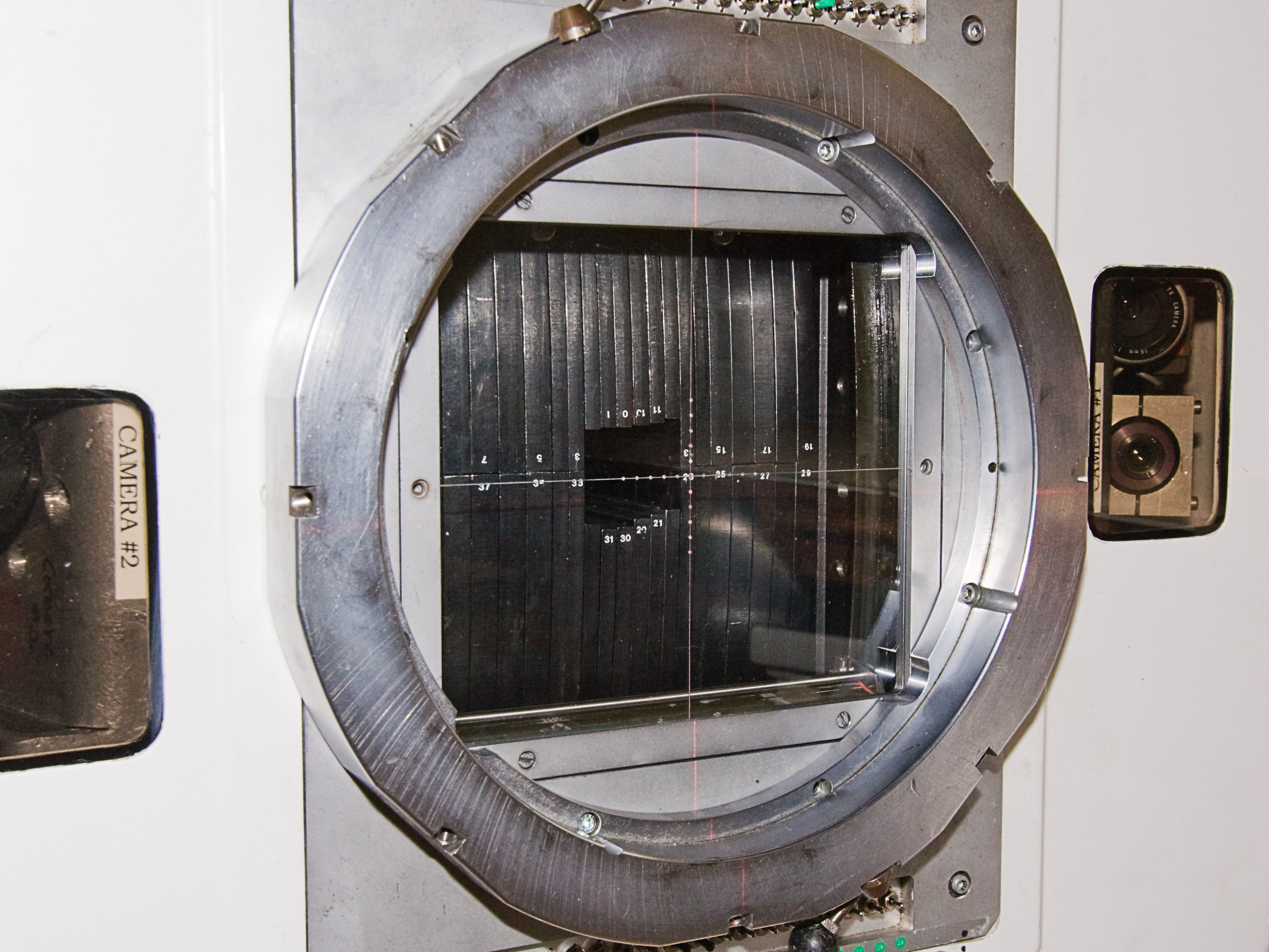
Collimator for a neutron stream, University of Washington cyclotron

Although collimators improve resolution, they also reduce intensity by blocking incoming radiation, which is undesirable for remote sensing instruments that require high sensitivity. For this reason, the gamma ray spectrometer on the Mars Odyssey is a non-collimated instrument. Most lead collimators let less than 1% of incident photons through. Attempts have been made to replace collimators with electronic analysis.

=== In radiation therapy ===
Collimators (beam limiting devices) are used in linear accelerators used for radiotherapy treatments. They help to shape the beam of radiation emerging from the machine and can limit the maximum field size of a beam.

The treatment head of a linear accelerator consists of both a primary and secondary collimator. The primary collimator is positioned after the electron beam has reached a vertical orientation. When using photons, it is placed after the beam has passed through the X-ray target. The secondary collimator is positioned after either a flattening filter (for photon therapy) or a scattering foil (for electron therapy). The secondary collimator consists of two jaws which can be moved to either enlarge or minimize the size of the treatment field.

New systems involving multileaf collimators (MLCs) are used to further shape a beam to localise treatment fields in radiotherapy. MLCs consist of approximately 50–120 leaves of heavy-metal collimator plates which slide into place to form the desired field shape.

=== Computing the spatial resolution ===
To find the spatial resolution of a parallel hole collimator with a hole length, $l$, a hole diameter $D$ and a distance to the imaged object $s$, the following formula can be used
$$R_\text{collimator} = D + \frac{Ds}{l_\text{effective}}$$
where the effective length is defined as
$$l_\text{effective} = l - \frac{2}{\mu}$$
Where $\mu$ is the linear attenuation coefficient of the material from which the collimator is made.

== See also ==
- Autocollimation
- Autocollimator
- Collimated light
- Hohlraum
- Nonimaging optics
- Snoot in lighting
- Reflector sight in fighter cockpits
