= Snoot =

Photographic lighting

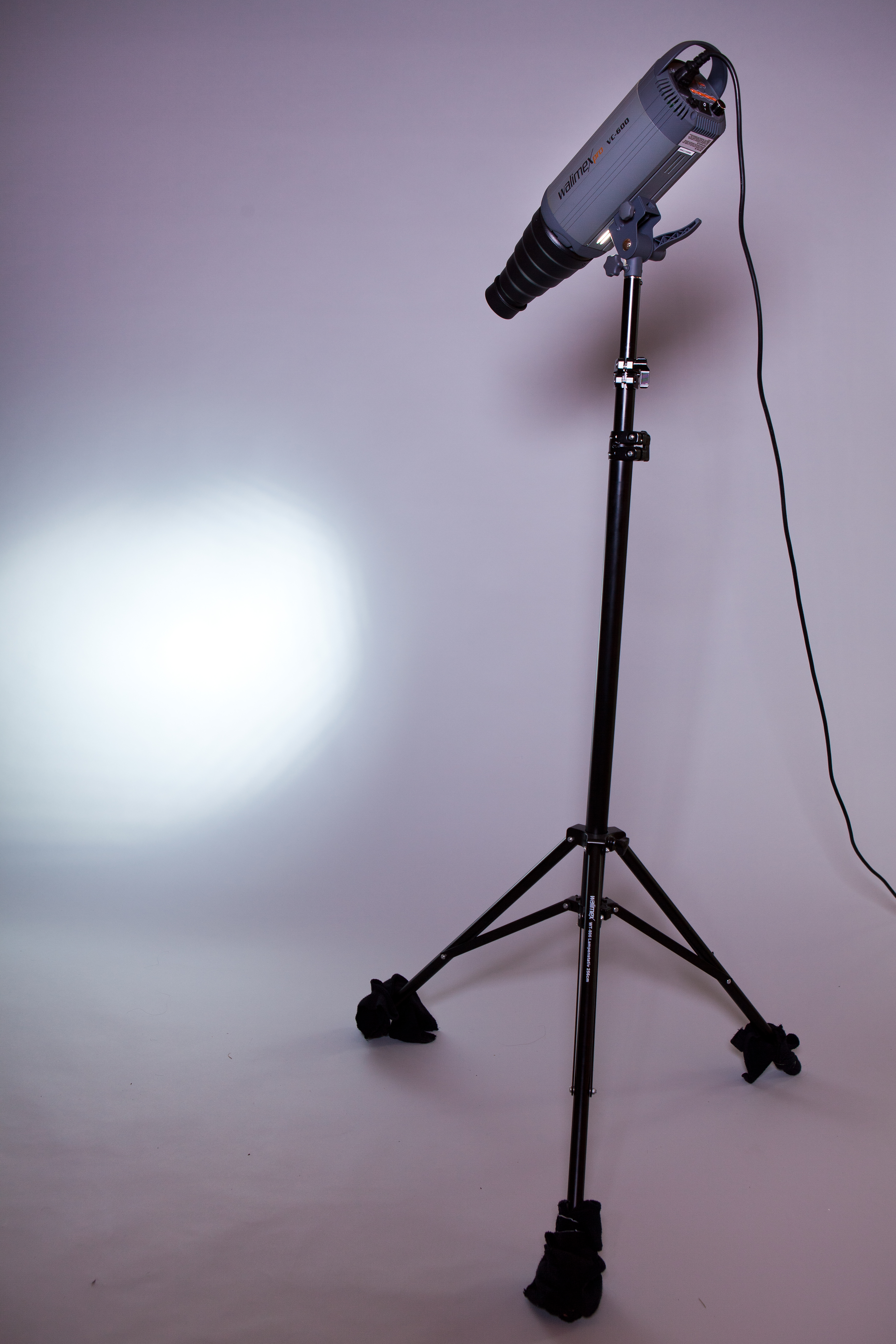
A snoot

A snoot is a tube or similar object that fits over a light used in theatrical lighting or photography, to control the direction and radius of the light beam. Snoots can be cylindrical or truncated conical in shape, different lengths and diameters, and made of various materials.

In photography, a snoot is attached to a studio light or portable flash, and may be conical, cylindrical, or rectangular in shape. Snoots can isolate a subject when using a flash. They help by stopping "light spill", or when lighting falls in a larger footprint than intended. Because the inside of a snoot is usually black and non-reflective, it blocks bounced and diffused light, so that mainly direct light from the source leaves the opening, producing a hard light with a very limited spread. Snoots are used to brighten small areas, such as a detail in a product shot or a subject's hair, or to light a label or part of the background; a grid fitted to the snoot narrows the circle of light further.

== See also ==
- Collimator
- Top hat
