= Collimated beam =

Light all pointing in the same direction

In the lower picture, the light has been collimated.

A collimated beam of light or other electromagnetic radiation has parallel rays, and therefore will spread minimally as it propagates. A laser beam is an archetypical example. A perfectly collimated light beam, with no divergence, would not disperse with distance. However, diffraction prevents the creation of any such beam.

Light can be approximately collimated by a number of processes, for instance by means of a collimator. Perfectly collimated light is sometimes said to be focused at infinity. Thus, as the distance from a point source increases, the spherical wavefronts become flatter and closer to plane waves, which are perfectly collimated.

Other forms of electromagnetic radiation can also be collimated. In radiology, X-rays are collimated to reduce the volume of the patient's tissue that is irradiated, and to remove stray photons that reduce the quality of the x-ray image ("film fog"). In scintigraphy, a gamma ray collimator is used in front of a detector to allow only photons perpendicular to the surface to be detected.

The term collimated may also be applied to particle beams – a collimated particle beam – where typically shielding blocks of high density materials (such as lead, bismuth alloys, etc.) may be used to absorb or block peripheral particles from a desired forward direction, especially a sequence of such absorbing collimators. This method of particle collimation is routinely deployed and is ubiquitous in every particle accelerator complex in the world. An additional method enabling this same forward collimation effect, less well studied, may deploy strategic nuclear polarization (magnetic polarization of nuclei) if the requisite reactions are designed into any given experimental applications.

== Etymology ==
The word "collimate" comes from the Latin verb collimare, which originated in a misreading of collineare, "to direct in a straight line".

== Sources ==
=== Lasers ===
Laser light from gas or crystal lasers is highly collimated because it is formed in an optical cavity between two parallel mirrors which constrain the light to a path perpendicular to the surfaces of the mirrors. In practice, gas lasers can use concave mirrors, flat mirrors, or a combination of both. The divergence of high-quality laser beams is commonly less than 1 milliradian (3.4 arcmin), and can be much less for large-diameter beams. Laser diodes emit less-collimated light due to their short cavity, and therefore higher collimation requires a collimating lens.

=== Synchrotron light ===
Synchrotron light is very well collimated. It is produced by bending relativistic electrons (i.e. those moving at relativistic speeds) around a circular track. When the electrons are at relativistic speeds, the resulting radiation is highly collimated, a result which does not occur at lower speeds.

=== Distant sources ===
The light from stars (other than the Sun) arrives at Earth precisely collimated, because stars are so far away they present no detectable angular size. However, due to refraction and turbulence in the Earth's atmosphere, starlight arrives slightly uncollimated at the ground with an apparent angular diameter of about 0.4 arcseconds. Direct rays of light from the Sun arrive at the Earth uncollimated by one-half degree, this being the angular diameter of the Sun as seen from Earth. During a solar eclipse, the Sun's light becomes increasingly collimated as the visible surface shrinks to a thin crescent and ultimately a small point, producing the phenomena of distinct shadows and shadow bands.

=== Lenses and mirrors ===
An example of an optical collimating lens.

A perfect parabolic mirror will bring parallel rays to a focus at a single point. Conversely, a point source at the focus of a parabolic mirror will produce a beam of collimated light creating a collimator. Since the source needs to be small, such an optical system cannot produce much optical power. Spherical mirrors are easier to make than parabolic mirrors and they are often used to produce approximately collimated light. Many types of lenses can also produce collimated light from point-like sources.

== Collimation and decollimation ==
"Collimation" refers to all the optical elements in an instrument being on their designed optical axis. It also refers to the process of adjusting an optical instrument so that all its elements are on that designed axis (in line and parallel). The unconditional aligning of binoculars is a 3-axis collimation, meaning both optical axis that provide stereoscopic vision are aligned parallel with the axis of the hinge used to select various interpupillary distance settings. With regards to a telescope, the term refers to the fact that the optical axis of each optical component should be centered and parallel, so that collimated light emerges from the eyepiece. Most amateur reflector telescopes need to be re-collimated every few years to maintain optimum performance. This can be done by simple visual methods such as looking down the optical assembly with no eyepiece to make sure the components are lined up, by using a Cheshire eyepiece, or with the assistance of a simple laser collimator or autocollimator. Collimation can also be tested using a shearing interferometer, which is often used to test laser collimation.

Collimated optical systems are also widely used in flight simulation. Full-motion simulators often incorporate collimated displays to present out-the-window visual scenes that appear geometrically accurate from both pilot positions.

"Decollimation" is any mechanism or process which causes a beam with the minimum possible ray divergence to diverge or converge from parallelism. Decollimation may be deliberate for systems reasons, or may be caused by many factors, such as refractive index inhomogeneities, occlusions, scattering, deflection, diffraction, reflection, and refraction. Decollimation must be accounted for to fully treat many systems such as radio, radar, sonar, and optical communications.

== See also ==
- Autocollimation
- Cross-cockpit collimated display
- Schlieren photography

== Bibliography ==
- Pfister, J. & Kneedler, J.A. (s.d.). A guide to lasers in the OR.
