= Autocollimation =

Optical arrangement with parallel rays

Autocollimation is an optical setup where a collimated beam (of parallel light rays) leaves an optical system and is reflected back into the same system by a plane mirror.

It is used for measuring small tilting angles of the mirror, see autocollimator, or for testing the quality of the optical system or of a part of it. Large-aperture optics, however, are tested with a null corrector avoiding the production of a large plane mirror.

One special application is to determine the focal length of a diverging lens: a light source is placed at twice the focal length of a converging lens on one side and a screen at the same distance on the other side so that the image of the light source is the sharpest possible. When this is achieved, the screen is replaced with a mirror and the diverging lens is inserted between the converging lens and the mirror at such a distance to the mirror that the light returning through the diverging and converging lenses produces a sharp image on top of the luminous object. This is the case when the beam hitting the mirror is collimated. The distance found is the (negative) focal length of the diverging lens.

Light from an origin point O is collimated (made parallel) by a high quality objective lens. If the collimated beam falls perpendicularly onto a plane reflecting surface, the light is reflected back along its original path and is brought to a focus at a point coincident with the origin point. If the reflector is tilted through an angle θ, the reflected beam is deflected through an angle 2θ, and the image I is displaced laterally from the origin 0. The amount of displacement is given by d = 2θf where f is the focal length of the lens, and θ is in radians. Light from an illuminated target graticule at the focus of an objective lens is directed towards the lens by a beam splitter. After reflection by a mirror on the workpiece, the light returns through the autocollimator and passes through the beam splitter, forming an image of the target graticule in the plane of an eyepiece graticule. The eyepiece graticule and the reflected image of the target graticule are viewed simultaneously through the eyepiece. The image of the target graticule is always seen in focus and at constant magnification in the eyepiece, regardless of the distance between the Autocollimator and the reflecting surface. However, at long working distances only a portion of the reflected target graticule may appear in the eyepiece, owing to the failure of obliquely returning rays to enter the autocollimator. This will result in a restricted measuring range.
