= Floating collimator =

1825 instrument for aligning telescopes

A Floating collimator was an early collimator widely used in astronomical observations. It was invented by the English physicist and astronomer Captain Henry Kater about 1825.

His collimator was meant to replace a level, or plumb-line, in astronomical observations, and to provide a ready and perfectly exact method of determining the position of the horizontal or zenith point on the limb of a circle or zenith sector. Its principle is the invariability, with respect to the horizon, of the position assumed by any object of constant shape and mass floating on a fluid.

A floating collimator consists of a rectangular box containing mercury, with a piece of cast iron floating on top. The cast-iron is about twelve inches long, four broad, and half an inch thick, having two short uprights or Y's of equal height on top. The uprights hold a small telescope sighted with crossed wires, or crossed portions of a fine balance-spring (very thin flat metal), set flat-ways, and adjusted very exactly in the sidereal focus of the object glass.

The float is browned with nitric acid to prevent the adhesion of the mercury, and is prevented from moving laterally by two smoothly polished iron pins, projecting from its sides in the middle of its length, which play freely in vertical grooves of polished iron in the sides of the box.

When this instrument is used, it is placed at a short distance from the circle whose horizontal point is to be ascertained, on either side, suppose the north, of its center, and the telescopes of the circle and of the collimator are so adjusted as to look mutually at each other's cross wires, in the manner practiced by astronomers Gauss and Friedrich Bessel, first of all coarsely, by trial, applying the eye to the eyeglasses of the two instruments alternately; and, finally, by illuminating the cross wires of the collimator by a lantern and oiled paper, taking care to exclude false light by a black screen, having an aperture equal to that of the collimator, and making the coincidence in the manner of an astronomical observation, by the fine motion of the circle.

The microscopes on the limb are then read off, and thus the apparent zenith distance of the collimating point, the intersection of the wires, is found. The collimator is then transferred to the other (south) side of the circle, and a corresponding observation made without reversing the circle, but merely by the motion of the telescope on the limb. The difference of the two zenith distances so read off is double the error of the zenith or horizontal point of the graduation, and their semi-sum is the true zenith distance of the collimating point, or the co-inclination of the axis of the collimating telescope to the horizon.

By the experiments detailed in Captain Kater's paper, read before the Royal Society in 1825, it appears that the error to be feared in the determination of the horizontal point by this instrument, can rarely amount to half a second, if a mean of four or five observations be taken. In 151 single trials, only two gave an error of two seconds, and one of these was made with a wooden float.
