= Cheshire eyepiece =

Tool for telescope alignment

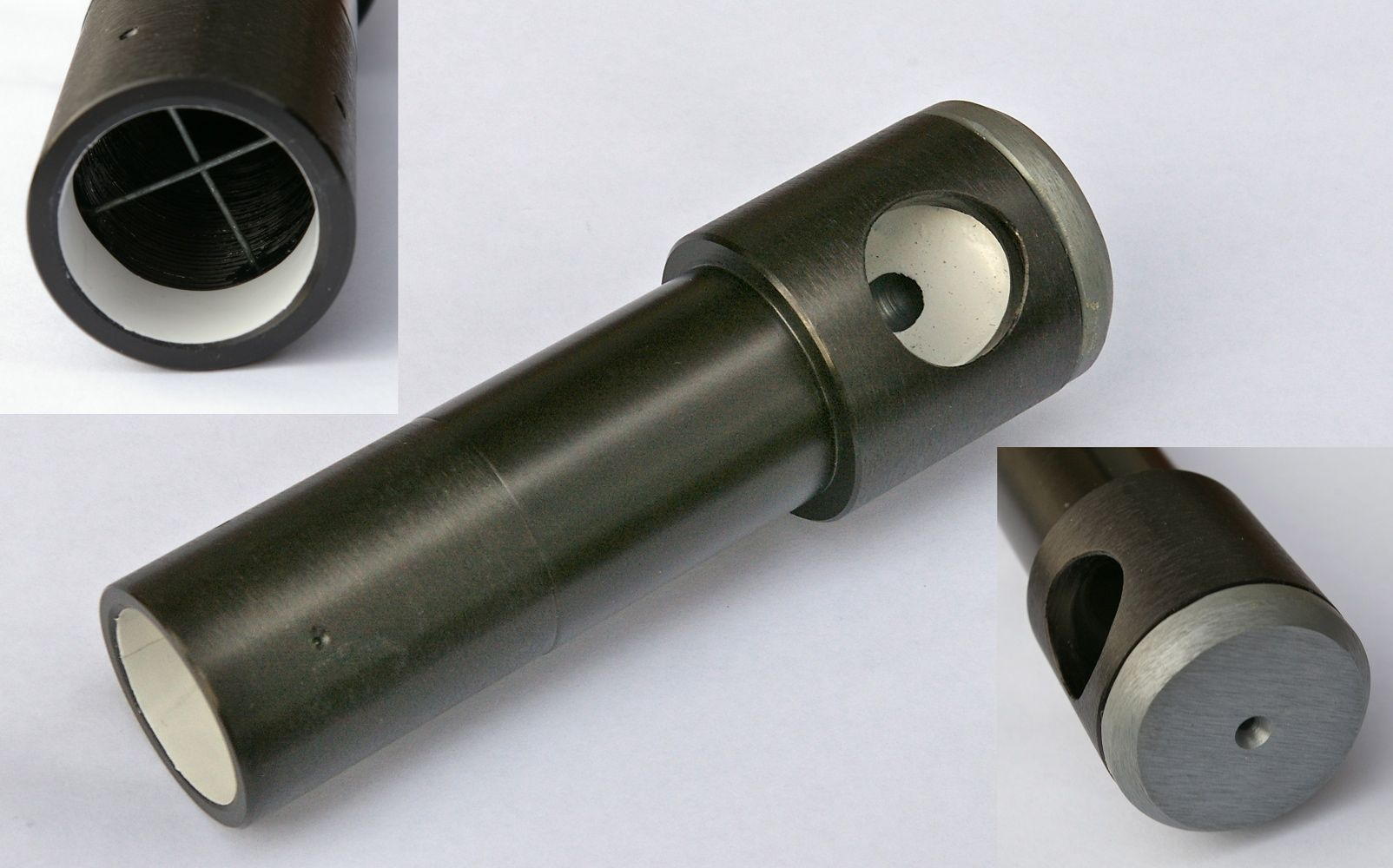
Cheshire eyepiece, combined with a sight tube and crosshairs

A Cheshire eyepiece or Cheshire collimator is a simple tool that helps aligning the optical axes of the mirrors or lenses of a telescope, a process called collimation. It consists of a peephole to be inserted into the focuser in place of the eyepiece. Through a lateral opening, ambient light falls on the brightly painted oblique back of the peephole. Images of this bright surface are reflected by the mirrors or lenses of the telescope and can thus be seen by a person peering through the hole. A Cheshire eyepiece contains no lenses or other polished optical surfaces.

The tool was first described by F. J. Cheshire in 1921. It was repopularized in the 1980s and is now mass-produced. Amateur astronomers in particular use them to collimate reflecting or refracting telescopes. Some modern models of Cheshire eyepieces in common use include extended sight tubes and are equipped with crosshairs. When inserted into a Newtonian telescope whose primary mirror is marked in its center, such aids allow the user to adjust the position and tilt of both the secondary and the primary mirror. It can also be used to verify focuser alignment.
