= MutS-1 =

MutS_I
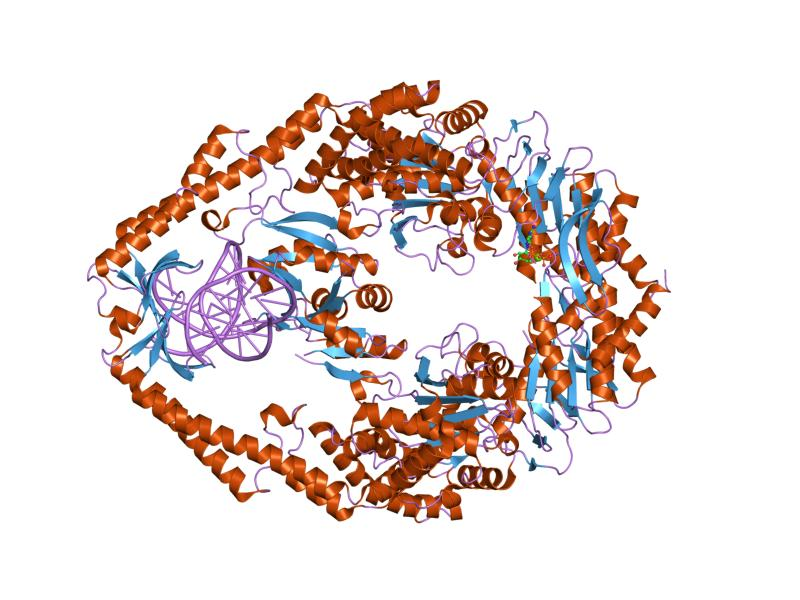
- The crystal structure of E. coli MutS binding to DNA with an a:a mismatch

Identifiers
- Symbol: MutS_I
- Pfam: PF01624
- InterPro: IPR007695
- SMART: MUTSd
- PROSITE: PDOC00388
- SCOP2: 1ng9 / SCOPe / SUPFAM
Available protein structures:
- PDB: IPR007695 PF01624 (ECOD; PDBsum)
- AlphaFold: IPR007695; PF01624

MutS is a mismatch DNA repair protein, originally described in Escherichia coli.

Mismatch repair contributes to the overall fidelity of DNA replication and is essential for combating the adverse effects of damage to the genome. It involves the correction of mismatched base pairs that have been missed by the proofreading element (Klenow fragment) of the DNA polymerase complex. The post-replicative Mismatch Repair System (MMRS) of Escherichia coli involves MutS (Mutator S), MutL and MutH proteins, and acts to correct point mutations or small insertion/deletion loops produced during DNA replication.

== General Function ==
MutS and MutL are involved in preventing recombination between partially homologous DNA sequences. The assembly of MMRS is initiated by MutS, which recognizes and binds to mispaired nucleotides and allows further action of MutL and MutH to eliminate a portion of newly synthesized DNA strand containing the mispaired base. MutS can also collaborate with methyltransferases in the repair of O(6)-methylguanine damage, which would otherwise pair with thymine during replication to create an O(6)mG:T mismatch. MutS exists as a dimer, where the two monomers have different conformations and form a heterodimer at the structural level. Only one monomer recognises the mismatch specifically and has ADP bound. Non-specific major groove DNA-binding domains from both monomers embrace the DNA in a clamp-like structure. Mismatch binding induces ATP uptake and a conformational change in the MutS protein, resulting in a clamp that translocates on DNA.

== Protein Structure ==
MutS is a modular protein with a complex structure, and is composed of:

- N-terminal mismatch-recognition domain, which is similar in structure to tRNA endonuclease.
- Connector domain, which is similar in structure to Holliday junction resolvase ruvC.
- Core domain, which is composed of two separate subdomains that join together to form a helical bundle; from within the core domain, two helices act as levers that extend towards (but do not touch) the DNA.
- Clamp domain, which is inserted between the two subdomains of the core domain at the top of the lever helices; the clamp domain has a beta-sheet structure.
- ATPase domain (connected to the core domain), which has a classical Walker A motif.
- HTH (helix-turn-helix) domain, which is involved in dimer contacts.

This entry represents the N-terminal domain of proteins in the MutS family of DNA mismatch repair proteins, as well as closely related proteins. The N-terminal domain of MutS is responsible for mismatch recognition and forms a 6-stranded mixed beta-sheet surrounded by three alpha-helices, which is similar to the structure of tRNA endonuclease. Yeast MSH3, bacterial proteins involved in DNA mismatch repair, and the predicted protein product of the Rep-3 gene of mouse share extensive sequence similarity. Human MSH has been implicated in non-polyposis colorectal carcinoma (HNPCC) and is a mismatch binding protein.

Biophysical studies have been conducted to investigate the binding mechanism of MutS on the mismatch sites, where the most commonly used sites of interest are G:T mismatch and T-bulge. It is observed that upon MutS binding, a 60° kink is introduced at the mismatch site. This sudden kink is recognised as an important step of the initial mismatch recognition, and in the ultimate MutS-DNA complex, the DNA is unbent. In the G/T mismatch binding experiment, phenylalanine insertion has been observed as an important driving force for different MutS homologues. In this process, the specific phenylalanine on MutS forms aromatic stacking with the unpaired thymine, and additional hydrogen bond could also be formed between thymine and the nearby residue on the MutS protein.

== Homologues and Protein Diversity ==
Homologues of MutS have been found in many species including eukaryotes (MSH 1, 2, 3, 4, 5, and 6 proteins), archaea and bacteria, and together these proteins have been grouped into the MutS family. Although many of these proteins have similar activities to the E. coli MutS, there is significant diversity of function among the MutS family members. This diversity is even seen within species, where many species encode multiple MutS homologues with distinct functions. Inter-species homologues may have arisen through frequent ancient horizontal gene transfer of MutS (and MutL) from bacteria to archaea and eukaryotes via endosymbiotic ancestors of mitochondria and chloroplasts.
