= Henry Kater =

British physicist (1777–1835)

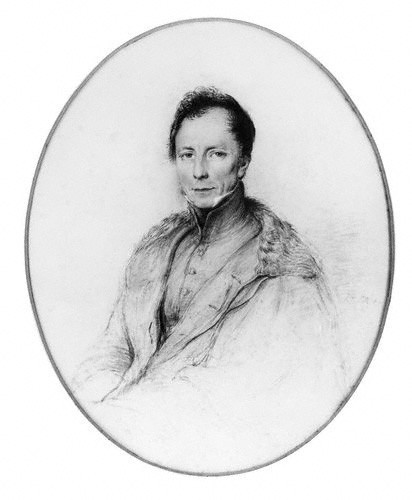
- Born: 16 April 1777; Bristol, Great Britain
- Died: 26 April 1835 (aged 58)
- Awards: Copley Medal (1817); Gold Medal of the Royal Astronomical Society (1831)
- Scientific career
- Fields: Physics

Henry Kater FRS, FRAS (16 April 1777 – 26 April 1835) was a British physicist of German descent.

== Early life ==
He was born in Bristol. At first he intended to study law; but he gave up the idea on his father's death in 1794. He entered the army, obtaining a commission in the 12th Regiment of Foot, then stationed in India, where he assisted William Lambton in the Great Trigonometric Survey. Failing health obliged him to return to England; and in 1808, then a lieutenant, he entered on a student career at the Senior Division of the new Royal Military College at High Wycombe. Shortly afterwards he was promoted to the rank of captain. In 1814 he retired on half-pay, and devoted the remainder of his life to scientific research.

== Scientist ==
His first major contribution to science was the comparison of the merits of the Cassegrainian and Gregorian telescopes; Kater determined the latter to be an inferior design.

His most substantial work was the invention of Kater's pendulum, enabling the strength of gravity to be determined, first at London and subsequently at various stations throughout the country. As the inventor of the floating collimator, Kater rendered a service to practical astronomy. He also published memoirs on British standards of length and mass; and in 1832 he published an account of his work on verifying the Russian standards of length. For these services to Russia he received in 1814 the decoration of the order of St. Anne; and the same year he was elected a Fellow of the Royal Society. In 1826, he was elected a foreign member of the Royal Swedish Academy of Sciences. Kater was elected a Foreign Honorary Member of the American Academy of Arts and Sciences in 1832. In 1833 he was elected a fellow of the Royal Astronomical Society.

He won the Copley Medal in 1817 and the Gold Medal of the Royal Astronomical Society in 1831.

He is considered as the inventor of the prismatic compass, patented a year later by Charles Schmalcalder. He also studied compass needles, his Bakerian lecture containing the results of many experiments. The treatise on "Mechanics" in Dionysius Lardner's Cabinet Cyclopedia was partly written by him; and his interest in more purely astronomical questions was shown by two papers in the Memoirs of the Royal Astronomical Society for 1831–1833 – one on an observation of Saturn's outer ring, the other on a method of determining longitude by means of lunar eclipses.

== Works ==
- Description of a floating collimator. London: William Nicol. 1825.
