= Autocollimator =

Optical instrument for non-contact measurement of angles

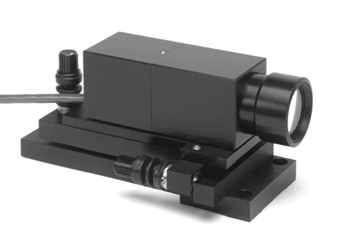
T100 autocollimator

An autocollimator is an optical instrument for non-contact measurement of angles. They are typically used to align components and measure deflections in optical or mechanical systems. An autocollimator works by projecting an image onto a target mirror and measuring the deflection of the returned image against a scale, either visually or by means of an electronic detector. A visual autocollimator can measure angles as small as 1 arcsecond (4.85 microradians), while an electronic autocollimator can have up to 100 times more resolution.

Visual autocollimators are often used for aligning laser rod ends and checking the face parallelism of optical windows and wedges. Electronic and digital autocollimators are used as angle measurement standards, for monitoring angular movement over long periods of time and for checking angular position repeatability in mechanical systems. Servo autocollimators are specialized compact forms of electronic autocollimators that are used in high-speed servo-feedback loops for stable-platform applications. An electronic autocollimator is typically calibrated to read the actual mirror angle.

== Electronic autocollimator ==
The electronic autocollimator is a high precision angle measurement instrument capable of measuring angular deviations with accuracy down to fractions of an arcsecond, by electronic means only, with no optical eye-piece.

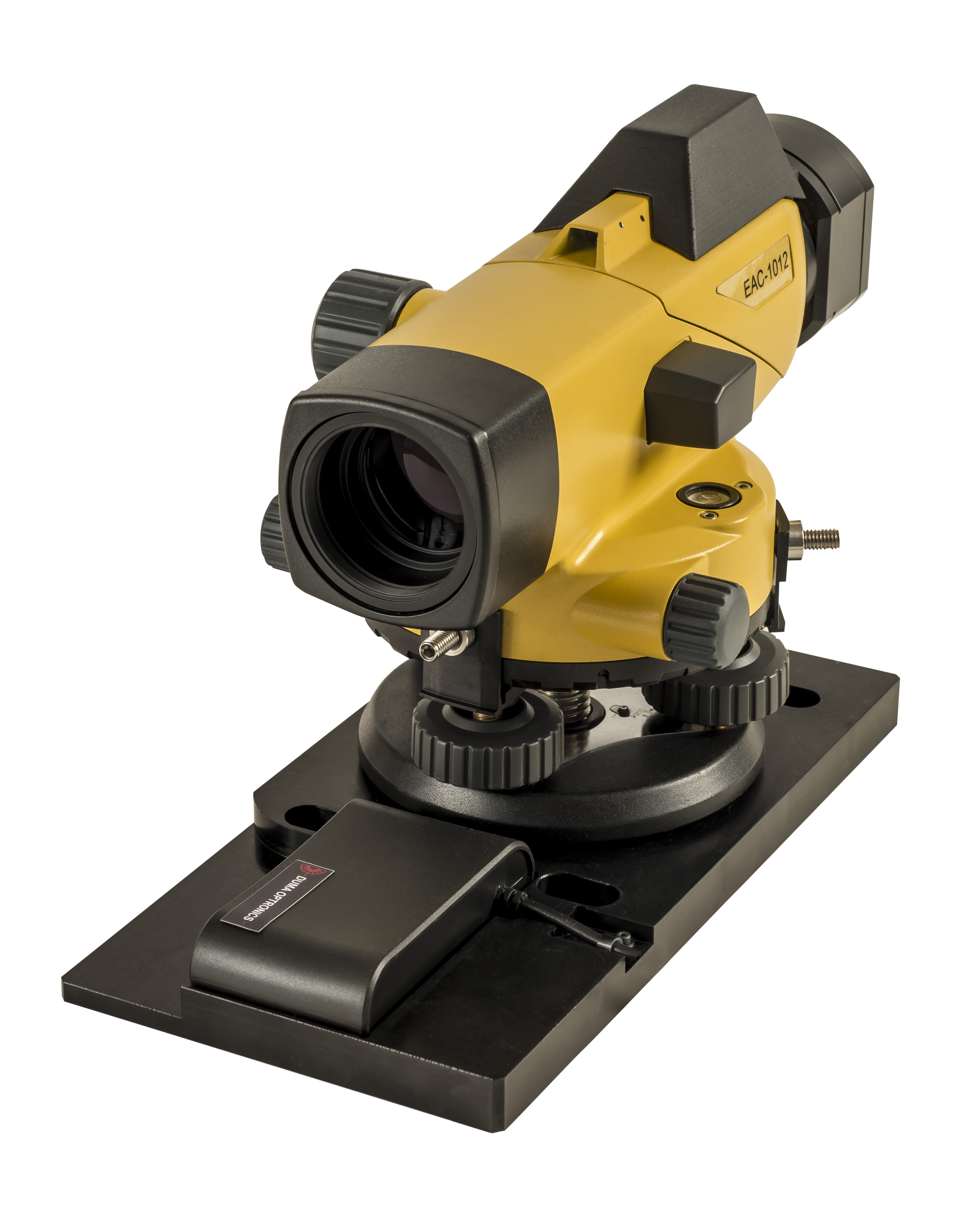
EAC-1012

Electronic autocollimator measurement offers speed, accuracy and cost-effectiveness, making it one of the most practical procedures available. Widely used in workshops, tool rooms, inspection departments and quality control laboratories, these highly sensitive instruments are designed to measure extremely small angular displacements, squareness, twist and parallelism.

== Laser analyzing autocollimator ==
Current technology allows has improved the autocollimation instrument to allow for direct measurements of incoming laser beams. This capability opens allows for inter-alignment between optics, mirrors and lasers. This fusion between the century-old technology of autocollimation with recent laser technology results has resulted in a versatile instrument capable of measuring the inter-alignment between multiple line of sights with respect to: mechanical datum, alignment of laser cavity, measurement of multiple rollers parallelism in roll to roll machinery, laser divergence angle and its spatial stability.

== Total station autocollimator ==
The concept of autocollimation as an optical instrument was conceived about a century ago for non-contact measurements of angles, as done in total stations. Hybrid technology fulfills a need recently developed by novel photonics applications has created for the alignment and measurement of optics and lasers. Implementing motorized focusing offers an additional measurement dimension by focusing on the area to be examined and performing alignment and deviations from alignment on the scale of microns. This is relevant in the adjustment phase as well as final testing and examination phases of integrated systems. Recent progress has been made in with the aim to serve the photonics AR/VR industry, involving development in interalingment, fusion of several wavelengths including NIR into one system, and measurements of multi laser array such as VCSEL in respect with other optical sensors, to improve angular accurate optical measurements to a resolution of 0.01 arcseconds.

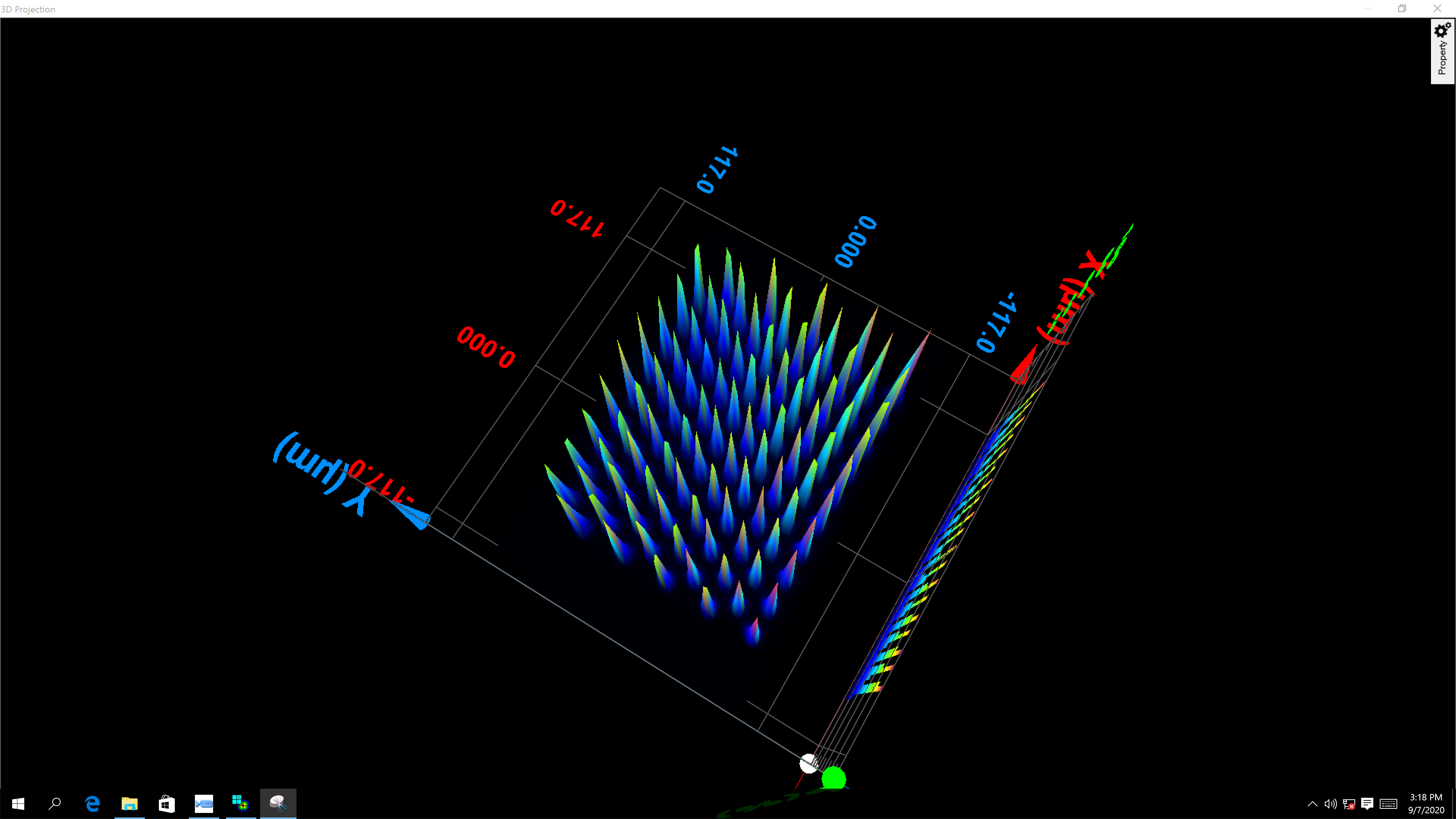
3D screenshot from the total station autocollimator analyzing software representing the VCSEL and their relative power levels

== Integrated autocollimator-based optical metrology ==
Recent developments in optical metrology have extended the role of the autocollimator beyond single-axis angular measurement into multi-functional, integrated measurement systems. By combining digital imaging sensors, multi-wavelength illumination, and computational analysis, modern autocollimator-based instruments can perform several optical diagnostics traditionally requiring multiple standalone laboratory devices.

Such systems use the autocollimator’s inherent sensitivity to angular deviations as a shared reference framework for additional measurements, including laser beam profiling, wavefront characterization, multi-axis alignment, and geometric verification. By operating within a common optical axis and coordinate system, these instruments reduce cumulative alignment errors that arise when measurements are distributed across separate devices.

Integrated autocollimator-based systems are increasingly designed for in-situ and in-line use, enabling real-time alignment and verification during optical assembly or laser manufacturing processes. This approach contrasts with conventional optical laboratories, where measurements are typically performed offline and sequentially.

The concept has been implemented in various hybrid optical metrology platforms developed by manufacturers and as well described in academic and patent literature addressing automated alignment and smart manufacturing.

The front runner of this technology is the so called Total Station Autocollimator implementing into one instrument up to 10 different instruments to be chosen by a press of a button.

As optical systems increase in complexity, integrated autocollimator-based metrology is increasingly viewed as a practical method for consolidating multiple optical measurements into a single, traceable instrument.

== Typical applications ==
An electronic autocollimator can be used in the measurement of straightness of machine components (such as guide ways) or the straightness of lines of motion of machine components. Flatness measurement of granite surface plates, for example, can be performed by measuring straightness of multiple lines along the flat surface, then summing the deviations in line angle over the surface. Recent advancements in applications allow angular orientation measurement of wafers. This could also be done without obstructing lines of sight to the wafer's surface itself. It is applicable in wafer measuring machines and wafer processing machines. Other applications include:

- Aircraft assembly jigs
- Satellite testing
- Steam and gas turbines
- Marine propulsion machinery
- Printing presses
- Air compressors
- Cranes
- Diesel engines
- Nuclear reactors
- Coal conveyors
- Shipbuilding and repair
- Rolling mills
- Rod and wire mills
- Extruder barrels

Optical measurement applications:

- Retroreflector measurement
- Roof prism measurement
- Optical assembly procedures
- Alignment of beam delivery systems
- Alignment of laser cavity
- Testing perpendicularity of laser rods in respect to its axis
- Real time measurement of angular stability of mirror elements.

== See also ==
- Autocollimation
- Collimator
