= Genetic predisposition =

Genetic characteristic

Genetic predisposition refers to a genetic characteristic which influences the possible phenotypic development of an individual organism within a species or population under the influence of environmental conditions. The term genetic susceptibility is often used synonymously with genetic predisposition and is further defined as the inherited risk for specific conditions, based on genetic variants. While environmental factors can influence disease onset, genetic predisposition plays a role in inherited risk of conditions, such as various cancers. At the molecular level, genetic predisposition often involves specific gene mutation, regulatory pathways, or epigenetic modifications that alter cellular processes, increasing disease risk.

== How to predict genetic predisposition ==
There are several approaches commonly used in the field of genetics to predict a genetic predisposition toward a disease.

- Genome-Wide Association Studies (GWAS): studies that identify genetic variants linked to diseases by analyzing genomes across populations. This approach looks for single nucleotide polymorphisms (SNPs) associated with a specific disease or trait.
- Polygenic Risk Scores (PRS): approach that combines the influence of multiple genetic variants and provides a measurable score for an individual's likelihood of developing certain conditions. Research around this approach is focused on predicting heart disease, cancer, and psychiatric disorders.
- Machine learning algorithms: the use of algorithms that integrate genetic data that have improved prediction accuracy for certain conditions, including diabetes and some cancers.
- Nomogram models: technique that combines genetic markers and clinical indicators to produce personalized risk assessments.

== Genetic predisposition at the molecular level ==
As individuals, one's genetic makeup or genotype, which is passed down from their parents, defines how they look and what genetic conditions they could have inherited, or be at risk for. These traits are exclusive, and therefore one's susceptibility to specific diseases is unique as well. The inheritance of specific genes reflect phenotypes based on one allele that comes from the mother and one from the father of each gene.

Phenotypes that display genetic conditions are often caused by random mutations within the DNA sequence that makes up a gene. Somatic mutations are mutations that occur within the DNA of a non-reproductive cell post-conception, and therefore cannot be inherited, nor will they contribute to one's genetic predisposition to disease. However, germline mutations occur within the DNA of reproductive cells and can be inherited by offspring, thereby influencing the individual's susceptibility to the specific genetic issue. Upon diagnosing individuals with particular conditions via genetic testing, their genetic predisposition can be measured with pedigree trees. These trees trace inheritance patterns throughout a family to see if the mutation of interest can also be found in other blood-related individuals.

== Genetic disease inheritance patterns ==
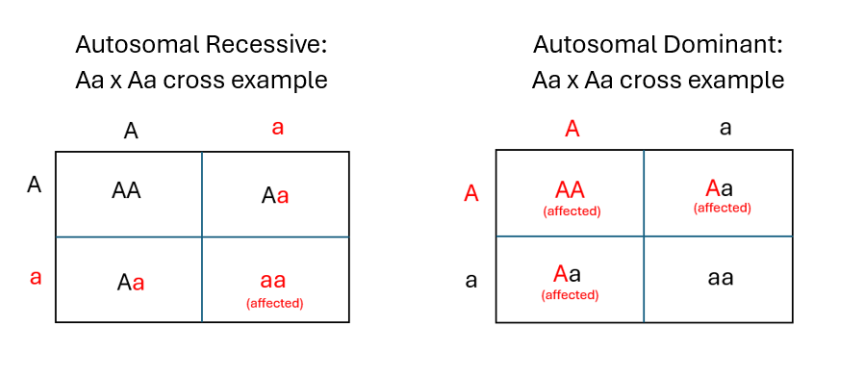
Autosomal recessive and dominant inheritance pattern examples demonstrated with Aa x Aa crosses

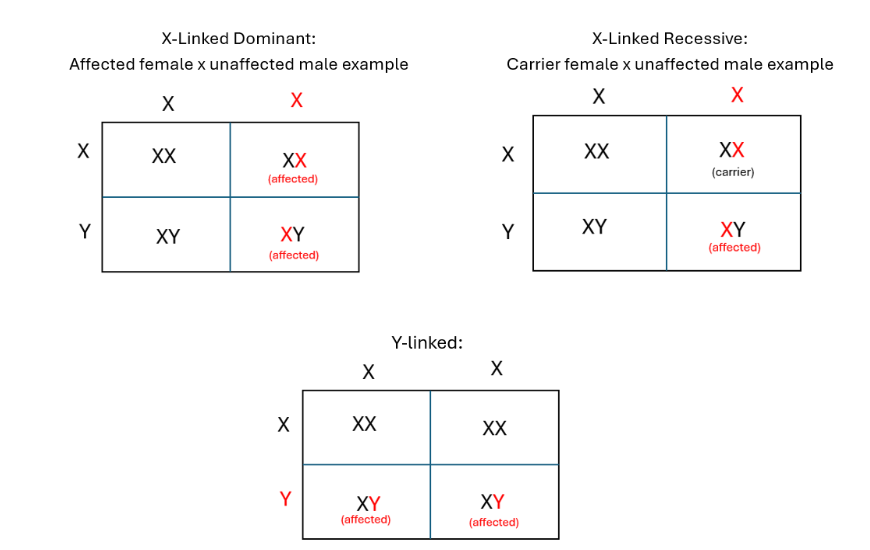
Sex chromosome inheritance pattern examples, demonstrating x-linked dominance, x-linked recessive, and y-linked.

Genetic diseases can be autosomal recessive, autosomal dominant, X chromosome-linked recessive, X chromosome-linked dominant or Y chromosome-linked. They will be inherited differently based on their composition. Autosomal inheritance patterns will affect specific autosomes, non-sex chromosomes, depending on the genetic disease. Autosomal recessive diseases occur only when both inherited alleles have the mutation, while autosomal dominant diseases will be demonstrated in individuals with only one mutant version of the allele. Therefore, besides solely inheritance, the type of disease that is being considered plays a large role in susceptibility. Genetic predisposition can also be impacted by one's gender, as sex chromosomes define inheritance of X-linked and Y-linked alleles. Males are far more likely to inherit X-linked recessive diseases, because they only have one copy of the X chromosome, while females have two and therefore need mutations in both for this phenotype to be demonstrated. X-linked dominant diseases are equally shown in both males and females, while Y-linked diseases will only be demonstrated in males, as females do not have a Y chromosome.

== Predisposition to cancer ==
Cancers are a major consideration when examining genetic predisposition to diseases, as they often arise from inherited genetic mutations that trigger uncontrolled cell growth. As genetic diseases, these mutations can be passed down through families, increasing an individual's risk of developing various types of cancer. Understanding an individual's genetic predisposition to cancer plays a key role in managing risk among family members and optimizing treatment.

=== Breast cancer ===
Genetic predisposition to breast cancer is categorized into three main risk groups. The first group consists of high-penetrance genes, such as BRCA1, BRCA2, and TP53. Mutations in these genes are inherited and significantly increase an individual's susceptibility to breast cancer. The second group includes intermediate-penetrance genes, such as CHEK2 and ATM. These genes are identified through mutational screening of DNA repair genes and increase an individual's risk of breast cancer, though not as severely as high-penetrance genes. The last category consists of low-penetrance alleles, which are SNPs more commonly found in populations, however still contribute to a slight increase in susceptibility to breast cancer. Genetic testing for high penetrance genes serves as an important indicator of breast cancer risk. Having the knowledge of predisposition to these genes can allow precautional measures to be taken towards prevention and treatment options early on, rather than not knowing until the disease has already progressed.

=== Colorectal cancer ===
Individuals with a genetic predisposition to colorectal cancer can benefit greatly from early and consistent monitoring. Hereditary Colorectal Cancer (HCRC) is typically associated with several genetic syndromes, each characterized by specific gene mutations that play a critical role in diagnosis and risk assessment. Lynch Syndrome is the most common, and results from inherited pathogenic variants in DNA mismatch repair genes such as MLH1, MSH2, and MSH6. Inheriting these mutations impairs the body's ability to correct DNA replication errors, significantly increasing the risk of developing colorectal and other cancers. Familial adenomatous polyposis (FAP) is another hereditary condition, caused by pathogenic mutations in the APC gene. If left untreated, it leads to a severe risk of developing colorectal cancer, typically before the age of 50. Genetic testing and screening is essential for identifying individuals at increased risk, enabling early detection strategies such as regular colonoscopies and informing preventive care for both patients and their family members. Early implementation of these measures has been shown to improve long term outcomes for those with inherited susceptibility.

== Behavioural predisposition ==
Genetic predisposition can also have an impact on psychological and behavioural phenotypes, as well as physical. An individual's predisposition towards certain human behaviors can be examined in an attempt to identify behavioural patterns that appear to be historically and evolutionarily invariant within a variety of different cultures.

Studies have shown that heritability and other genetic factors can greatly contribute to the risk of depression and suicidal behaviours. Genetic predisposition to depressive disorders is typically caused through interactions between specific genes with each other and their environment. More than 100 candidate genes have been identified that have the ability to increase risk of depression and contribute to its symptoms, which can be assessed via methodological approaches. Growing research is investigating how suicide can aggregate within families, further providing evidence that the alleles contributing to suicidal thoughts can be inherited. This has been further investigated through twin studies and adoption studies to measure the impacts of genetic information versus environment on one's behaviour.

== See also ==
- Human nature
- Nature versus nurture
- Behavioral genetics
- Predispositioning Theory
- Psychiatric genetics
- Gene-environment correlation
- Eugenics
- Allergy
- Oncogene
- Quantitative trait locus
- Genetic privacy
- Genetic discrimination
