= Muir–Torre syndrome =

- Other names: MTS
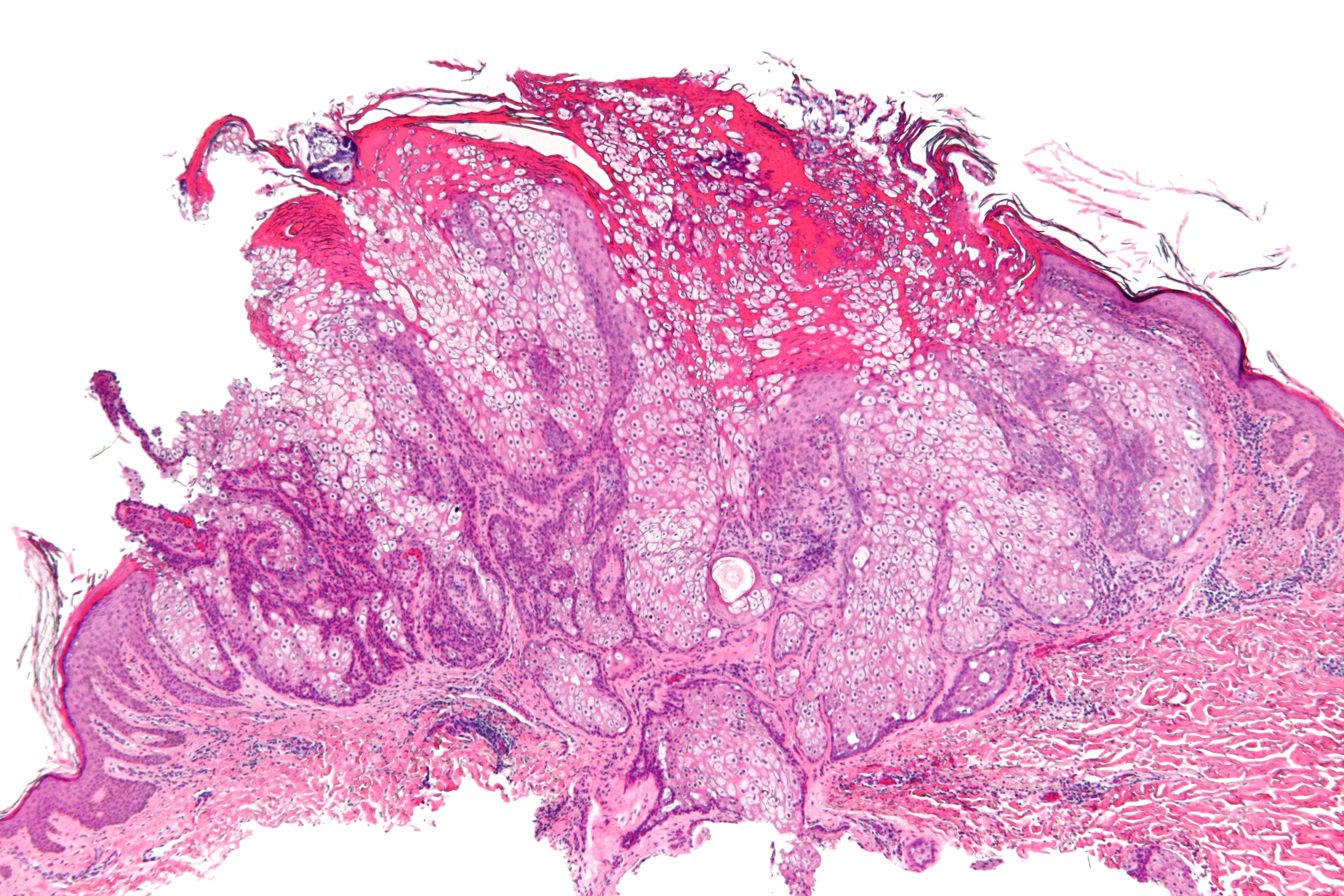
- Micrograph of a sebaceous adenoma, as may be seen in Muir–Torre syndrome. H&E stain.
- Specialty: Oncology, dermatology, medical genetics

Muir–Torre syndrome is a rare hereditary, autosomal dominant cancer syndrome that is thought to be a subtype of HNPCC (Lynch syndrome). Individuals are prone to develop cancers of the colon, genitourinary tract, and skin lesions, such as keratoacanthomas and sebaceous tumors. The genes affected are MLH1, MSH2, and more recently, MSH6, and are involved in DNA mismatch repair.

== Signs and symptoms ==
Muir–Torre syndrome is characterized by both:

1. At least a single sebaceous gland tumor (either an adenoma, an epithelioma, or a carcinoma)
2. A minimum of one internal malignancy

The Amsterdam criteria are frequently used to diagnose Lynch syndrome and Muir–Torre syndrome. They include the following:

- 3 or more relatives with an HNPCC-associated cancer (i.e., colorectal, cancer of the endometrium, small bowel, ureter, or renal pelvis)
- 2 or more successive generations affected by cancer
- 1 or more persons with cancer is a first-degree relative of the other 2, at least 1 case of colorectal cancer younger than age 50 years, a diagnosis of familial adenomatous polyposis has been excluded, and tumors are verified by histologic examination

Muir–Torre syndrome is a genetic condition. Mutations in MLH1 and MSH2 are linked with the disease. These genes code for DNA mismatch repair genes, and mutations increase the risk of developing cancerous qualities.

Many patients who have sebaceous neoplasms with mutations in MSH2 and MLH1 do not, in fact, have Muir–Torre syndrome. The Mayo Muir–Torre syndrome risk scoring system was devised to improve the positive predictive value of immunohistochemistry and reduce the false positive rate. The Mayo Muir–Torre risk scoring system assigns points based on several characteristics. A score of 2 or greater has a high positive predictive value for Muir–Torre syndrome. A score of 1 or lower is less likely to be Muir–Torre syndrome.

Age of onset of first sebaceous neoplasm: <60 years = 1 point, otherwise 0 points Total number of sebaceous neoplasms: 1 = 0 points, >2 = 2 points. Personal history of Lynch related cancers: No = 0 points, Yes = 1 point Family history of Lynch-related cancer: No = 0 points, Yes = 1 point

The most common internal malignancies associated with Muir–Torre syndrome are: Colorectal (56%), Urogenital (22%), Small Intestine (4%), and Breast (4%). A variety of other internal malignancies have been reported.

== Cause ==
=== Genetic overlap with Turcot syndrome ===
A couple of studies have been conducted on patients with both Muir–Torre syndrome and Turcot syndrome. It is thought that the two may have some genetic overlap. Both have been associated with defects in MLH1 and MSH2 genes.

In one study, a patient with defective MSH2 and MSH6 mismatch repair genes exhibited both syndromes. This is the first case where a patient with genotypic changes consistent with HNPCC has been properly diagnosed with an overlap of both syndromes. Along with neoplasms of the sebaceous gland, this patient developed cerebral neoplasms, characteristic of Turcot syndrome.

== Diagnosis ==
Immunohistochemistry is now being used more often to diagnose patients likely to have Muir–Torre syndrome. Sebaceous neoplasms are only infrequently encountered, and immunohistochemistry is reliable and readily available, so researchers have recommended its use. Routine immunohistochemical detection of DNA mismatch repair proteins helps identify hereditary DNA mismatch repair deficiency.

== Treatment ==
Treatment of Muir–Torre syndrome normally consists of oral isotretinoin. The drug has been found to prevent tumor development.

Patients with Muir–Torre syndrome should follow the same stringent screening for colorectal carcinoma and other malignancies as patients with Lynch syndrome. This includes frequent and early colonoscopies, mammograms, dermatologic evaluation, and imaging of the abdomen and pelvis.

== Epidemiology ==
Muir–Torre was observed to occur in 14 of 50 families (28%) and in 14 of 152 individuals (9.2%) with Lynch syndrome, also known as HNPCC.

The two major MMR proteins involved are hMLH1 and hMSH2. Approximately 70% of tumors associated with the MTS have microsatellite instability. While germline disruption of hMLH1 and hMSH2 is evenly distributed in HNPCC, disruption of hMSH2 is seen in greater than 90% of MTS patients.

Gastrointestinal and genitourinary cancers are the most common internal malignancies. Colorectal cancer is the most common visceral neoplasm in Muir–Torre syndrome patients.

== Eponym ==
The syndrome is named for Edward Grainger Muir and Douglas P. Torre. A British physician and surgeon, Muir noted a patient with many keratoacanthomas who went on to develop several internal malignancies at a young age in the 1960s. Torre, a New York dermatologist, presented his findings at a meeting of the New York Dermatologic Society.

It was not until the 1980s that Creighton professor Henry T. Lynch noted a clustering of Muir–Torre syndrome patients in families with Lynch syndrome.

== See also ==
- List of cutaneous conditions
- List of cutaneous conditions associated with increased risk of nonmelanoma skin cancer
