= Mismatch repair cancer syndrome =

Cancer syndrome

- Other names: Brain tumor-polyposis syndrome, Glioma-polyposis syndrome, Turcot syndrome
- This condition is inherited in an autosomal recessive manner
- Specialty: Oncology

Mismatch repair cancer syndrome (MMRCS) is a cancer syndrome associated with biallelic DNA mismatch repair mutations. It is also known as Turcot syndrome (after Jacques Turcot, who described the condition in 1959) and by several other names.

In MMRCS, neoplasia typically occurs in both the gut and the central nervous system (CNS). In the large intestine, multiple colonic polyps develop; in the CNS, brain tumors.

== Genetics ==
Under the name constitutional mismatch repair-deficiency (CMMR-D), it has been mapped to MLH1, MSH2, MSH6 or PMS2. Monoallelic mutations of these genes are observed in the condition known as Lynch syndrome or hereditary nonpolyposis colorectal cancer, while biallelic mutations are observed in CMMR-D. People expressing the HNPCC (which itself is considered autosomal dominant) trait are considered carriers of CMMR-D, thus CMMR-D is classified as autosomal recessive.

The term "childhood cancer syndrome" has also been proposed. Café-au-lait macules have been observed.

== Diagnosis ==
Childhood to early adult onset HNPCC + malignant gliomas. The polyps developed tend to be larger, fewer, and progress to malignancy earlier than those seen in familial adenomatous polyposis, a clinically similar condition with different underlying mutations. Diagnostic testing consists of a blood sample being collected, and a genetic specialist compares two copies of a patient's gene to normal MMR genes. If there are differences in the genes, the specialists are able to further test and decide if the patient has the deficiency.

== History ==
OMIM currently includes "Turcot syndrome" under "mismatch repair cancer syndrome". Turcot syndrome is the association between familial polyposis of the colon and brain tumors like medulloblastoma or malignant glioma. It was first reported by Canadian surgeon Jacques Turcot (1914–1977 ) et al. in 1959 and hence carries the first author's name.

== See also ==
- Gardner syndrome
