= MSH3 =

Protein found in humans

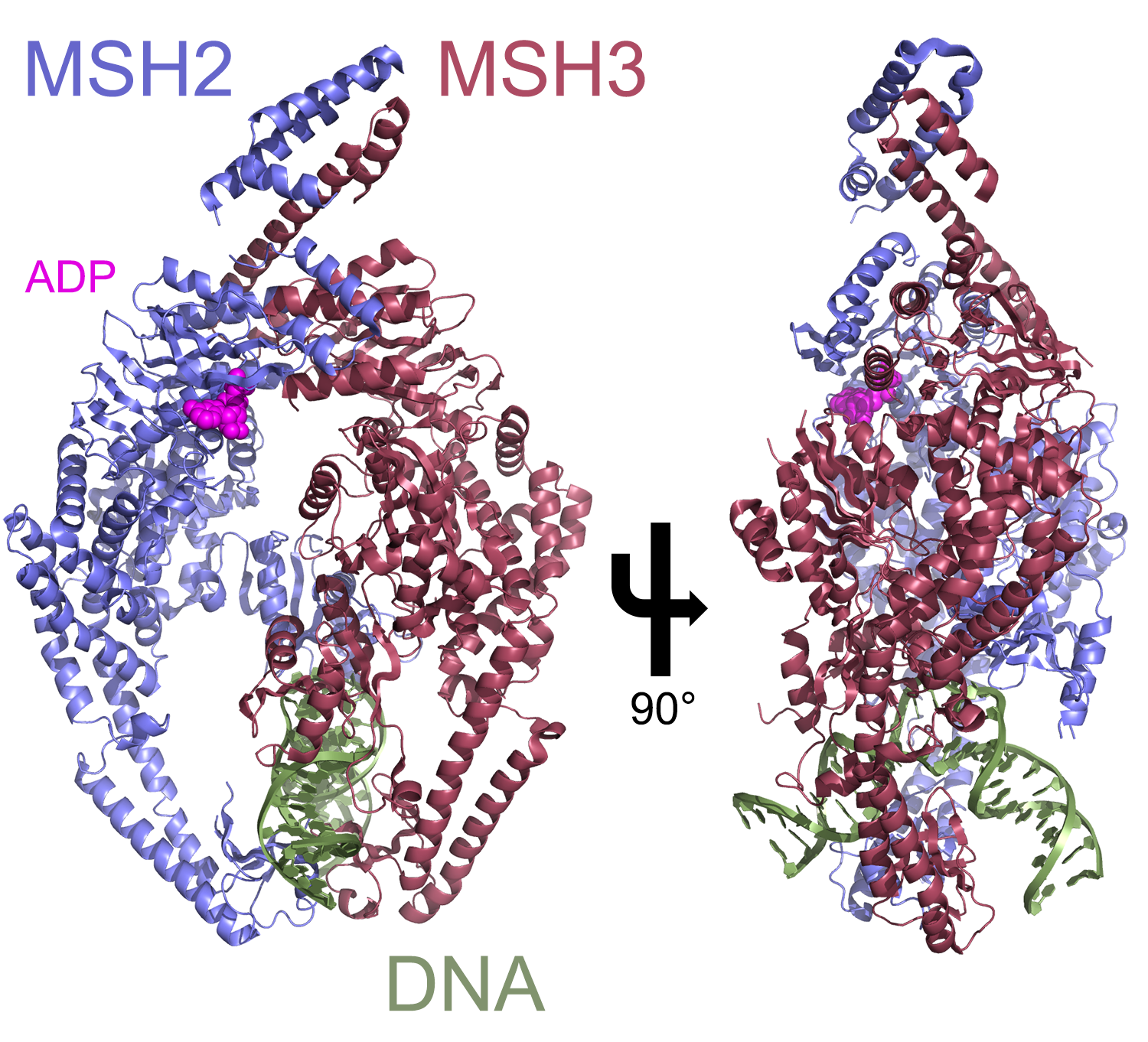
- Crystal structure of MutS-beta, the complex of MSH2 and MSH3. PDB 3THX

Identifiers
- Aliases: MSH3, DUP, MRP1, mutS homolog 3, FAP4
- External IDs: OMIM: 600887; MGI: 109519; GeneCards: MSH3
Available structures
| PDB | Ortholog search: PDBe RCSB |
| PDB | List of PDB id codes 3THW, 3THX, 3THY, 3THZ |

Gene location (Human)
| Chr. | Chromosome 5 (human) |
| Band | 5q14.1 | Start | 80,654,652 bp |
| Band | 5q14.1 | End | 80,876,815 bp |

Gene location (Mouse)
| Chr. | Chromosome 13 (mouse) |
| Band | 13 C3|13 47.63 cM | Start | 92,348,380 bp |
| Band | 13 C3|13 47.63 cM | End | 92,491,511 bp |
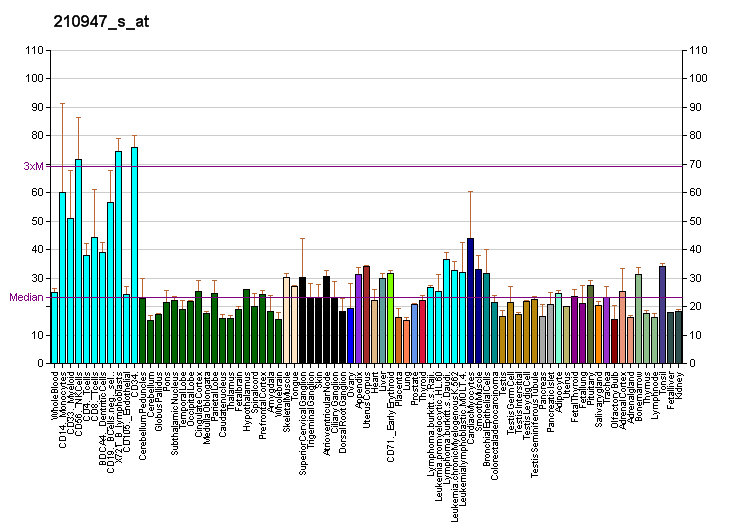

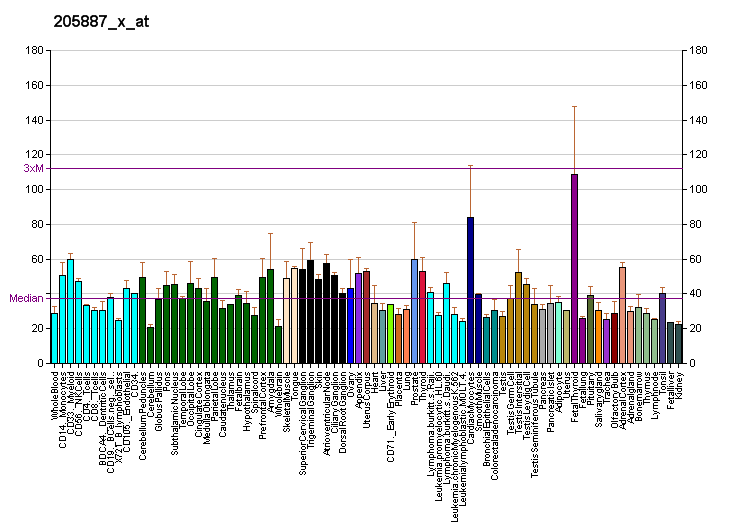
RNA expression pattern
| Bgee | Human / Mouse (ortholog); Top expressed in: bronchial epithelial cell; mucosa of paranasal sinus; secondary oocyte; cardia; gonad; testicle; renal medulla; external globus pallidus; subthalamic nucleus; Achilles tendon / Top expressed in: zygote; tail of embryo; spermatocyte; secondary oocyte; genital tubercle; primary oocyte; ventricular zone; epiblast; spermatid; neural layer of retina; More reference expression data |
| BioGPS | More reference expression data |
Gene ontology
| Molecular function | nucleotide binding; DNA binding; protein homodimerization activity; mismatched DNA binding; dinucleotide insertion or deletion binding; oxidized purine DNA binding; single-stranded DNA binding; protein binding; enzyme binding; dinucleotide repeat insertion binding; ATP binding; single guanine insertion binding; guanine/thymine mispair binding; Y-form DNA binding; heteroduplex DNA loop binding; double-strand/single-strand DNA junction binding; damaged DNA binding; ATP-dependent activity, acting on DNA; single thymine insertion binding; DNA insertion or deletion binding |
| Cellular component | MutSbeta complex; membrane; nucleoplasm; nucleus; mismatch repair complex |
| Biological process | cellular response to DNA damage stimulus; maintenance of DNA repeat elements; positive regulation of helicase activity; negative regulation of DNA recombination; DNA mismatch repair; DNA repair; somatic recombination of immunoglobulin gene segments; meiotic mismatch repair; removal of nonhomologous ends; mitotic recombination; reciprocal meiotic recombination; replication fork arrest |
Sources:Amigo / QuickGO
Orthologs
| Databases | NCBI: entry; OMA: entry |
| Species | Human | Mouse |
| Entrez | 4437 | 17686 |
| Ensembl | ENSG00000113318 | ENSMUSG00000014850 |
| UniProt | P20585 | P13705 |
| RefSeq (mRNA) | NM_002439 | NM_010829; NM_001311120 |
| RefSeq (protein) | NP_002430 | NP_001298049; NP_034959 |
| Location (UCSC) | Chr 5: 80.65 – 80.88 Mb | Chr 13: 92.35 – 92.49 Mb |
| PubMed search |
- Wikidata
| View/Edit Human | View/Edit Mouse |

DNA mismatch repair protein, MutS Homolog 3 (MSH3) is a human homologue of the bacterial mismatch repair protein MutS that participates in the mismatch repair (MMR) system. MSH3 typically forms the heterodimer MutSβ with MSH2 in order to correct long insertion/deletion loops and base-base mispairs in microsatellites during DNA synthesis. Deficient capacity for MMR is found in approximately 15% of colorectal cancers, and somatic mutations in the MSH3 gene can be found in nearly 50% of MMR-deficient colorectal cancers.

== Gene ==
In humans, the encoding gene for MSH3 is found on chromosome 5 at location 5q11-q12 upstream of the dihydrofolate reductase (DHFR) gene. MSH3 is encoded by 222,341 base pairs and creates a protein consisting of 1137 amino acids.

== Expression ==
MSH3 is typically expressed at low levels in several transformed cell lines—including HeLa, K562, HL-60, and CEM—as well as a large range of normal tissues including spleen, thymus, prostate, testis, ovary, small intestine, colon, peripheral blood leukocytes, heart, brain, placenta, lung, liver, skeletal muscle kidney, and pancreas. Although expression levels of MSH3 vary slightly from tissue to tissue, its widespread low-level expression indicates that it is a "housekeeping" gene commonly expressed in all cells.

Over-expression of MSH3 decreased capacity for MMR. When MSH3 is over expressed, drastic changes occur in the relative levels of formation of MutSβ at the expense of MutSα. MutSα is responsible for base-base mispairs and short insertion/deletion loops, while MutSβ repairs long insertion/deletion loops in DNA. A drastic shift in the relative levels of these protein complexes can lead to diminished capacity for MMR. In the case of MSH3 overexpression, MSH2 preferentially heterodimerizes with MSH3 leading to high levels of MutSβ and degradation of the partnerless MSH6 protein which normally complexes with MSH2 to form MutSα.

== Interactions ==
MSH3 has been shown to interact with MSH2, PCNA, and BRCA1. These interactions form protein complexes that are typically involved in tumor suppression and DNA repair activities.

The primary interaction of MSH3 involves forming the MutSβ complex with MSH2. MutSβ forms as a heterodimer of MSH2 and MSH3 with two primary interaction regions: an amino-terminal region and a carboxy-terminal region. The N-terminal region of MSH3 (amino acids 126-250) contact the N-terminal region of MSH2 aa 378-625. The C-terminal regions connect at aa 1050-1128 of MSH3 and aa 875-934 of MSH2. The binding regions on MSH2 are identical when binding to either MSH3 or MSH6. Adenine nucleotide binding regions in MSH3 and MSH2 are not contained in either of the interaction regions involved in dimerization, allowing MutSβ to bind to DNA and perform MMR.

External image
- MutSβ Binding sites for MSH3 and MSH2 Model of the hMSH2 consensus interaction with hMSH3 or hMSH6. The interaction regions of hMSH2 with hMSH3 and of hMSH2 with hMSH6 are shown in gray and they are connected with lines that illustrate the specificity of each region to their pairing partner. The nucleotide binding regions are shown as black boxes. The location of the HNPCC mutations tested in these studies are illustrated as black diamonds. The N-terminal region of MSH3 (amino acids 126-250) contact the N-terminal region of MSH2 aa 378-625. The C-terminal regions connect at aa 1050-1128 of MSH3 and aa 875-934 of MSH2. The binding regions on MSH2 are identical when binding to either MSH3 or MSH6.

Proliferating cell nuclear antigen (PCNA) is a protein involved in post-replication MMR. It has been shown that PCNA binds to the MutSβ heterodimer via a binding motif in the N-terminal domain of MSH3. Bound PCNA then localizes the MutSβ complex to replication foci, indicating that PCNA assists in initiating repair by guiding MutSβ and other repair proteins to free termini in recently replicated DNA.

== Function ==
The primary function of MSH3 is to maintain the stability of the genome and enact tumor suppression by forming the heterodimer MutSβ to correct long insertion/deletion loops and base-base mispairs. In the case of long insertion/deletion loops, DNA is severely bent and downstream basepairs can become unpaired and exposed. MutSβ recognizes insertion/deletion loops of 1-15 nucleotides; binding to insertion/deletion loops is achieved by inserting the mismatch-binding domain of MSH3 and part of the mismatch-binding domain of MSH2 into the groove formed by the extreme bend in DNA formed by the insertion/deletion loop.

External image
- IDL recognition by MutSβ. (a) A close-up comparison of MSH3—IDL interaction and Taq MutS with a single unpaired base (ΔT). (b) DNA-binding domains and DNA in Loop4. Domains I and IV of MSH2 are shown in green and yellow, and MBD and clamp domains of MSH3 in blue and orange. (c) Diagram of the protein-DNA interactions using the same color scheme as in (b). (d) Space-filling model of four IDLs and their interaction with domain I of MSH2 (green) and MBD of MSH3 (blue). The base pairs surrounding the IDL are shown in light (upstream) and dark (downstream) pink. For Loop2 and Loop4, a back view looking into the minor groove is also shown.

== Role in cancer ==
The most significant role of MSH3 in cancer is the suppression of tumors by repair of somatic mutations in DNA that occur as the result of base-base mispairs and insertion/deletion loops. Both loss of expression and over expression of MSH3 can lead to carcinogenic effects.

Over-expression of MSH3 can lead to drastic changes in the relative e levels of MutSα and MutSβ. Normally, MutSβ is expressed at relatively low levels throughout all cells while MutSα is present at high levels. While both proteins have redundant function in base-base repairs, MutSα typically effects base-base mispair repairs and also performs repairs on the more common short inertion/deletion loops. When MSH3 is heavily overexpressed, it acts as a sequester for MSH2 and the relative levels of MutSβ and MutSα shift dramatically as unpaired MSH6 proteins degrade and MutSα becomes depleted. MutSβ can compensate somewhat for loss of base-base mispair correction functions, but is not suited for repairing many short, 1–2 base pair insertion/deletion loops. This leads to a heightened rate of microsatellite instabilities and increased rates of somatic mutations.

This effect is directly related to human cancer in the form of drug resistance. One of the common resistance responses to methotrexate, a drug commonly used to treat childhood acute lymphocytic leukemia and a variety of other tumors, is amplification of the DHFR gene. DHFR amplification leads to overexpression of MSH3 and has been tied drug-resistant recurrence in cancer.

In contrast, loss of MSH3 can lead to mismatch repair deficiency and genetic instability which have been identified as particularly common carcinogenic effects in human colorectal cancer. Mutations causing MSH3 knockdown can lead to diminished capacity for cells to repair long insertion/deletion loops causing microsatellite instabilities (MSI) in the genome and allowing an increase in the rates of somatic mutation. Elevated microsatellite alterations at selected tetranucleotide repeats (EMAST) are a type of MSI where loci containing AAAG or ATAG tetranucleotide repeats are particularly unstable. EMAST phenotypes are particularly common, with nearly 60% of sporadic colorectal cancers displaying high levels of EMAST linked to a high-rate of MSH3 deficient cells in tumors.
