= MRNA-5671 =

Cancer vaccine candidate

mRNA-5671
Vaccine description
- Target: Cancer driven by G12D, G12V, G13D or G12C mutation in the KRAS gene
- Vaccine type: mRNA

Clinical data
- Routes of administration: Intramuscular

mRNA-5671 also known as V941 is a cancer vaccine candidate developed by Moderna. It is a tetravalent vaccine that targets G12D, G12V, G13D or G12C driver mutations in the KRAS gene. It is currently being evaluated for the treatment of either non-small cell lung cancer, colorectal cancers with microsatellite instability, or pancreatic adenocarcinoma, all with confirmed KRAS driver mutations.

In 2021 Merck dropped the trial, and clinicaltrials.gov study NCT03948763 ended on August 25, 2022. As of May 2024, no further progress on this vaccine has been announced.
