= Lynch Syndrome International =

American nonprofit organization

Lynch Syndrome International is a not for profit, tax exempt charity helping those with Lynch syndrome. It is recognized by the Internal Revenue Service as a 501(c)(3) not for profit charitable organization and contributions to the organization are tax-deductible in accordance with state and federal laws. Lynch Syndrome International, with an all volunteer staff, is the first organization of its type dedicated to the hereditary disease Lynch syndrome. The organization provides support for survivors and previvors who are diagnosed with Lynch Syndrome and for those who care for them. The international headquarters for Lynch Syndrome International are located in Vacaville, California.
