= PMS1 =

Protein-coding gene in humans

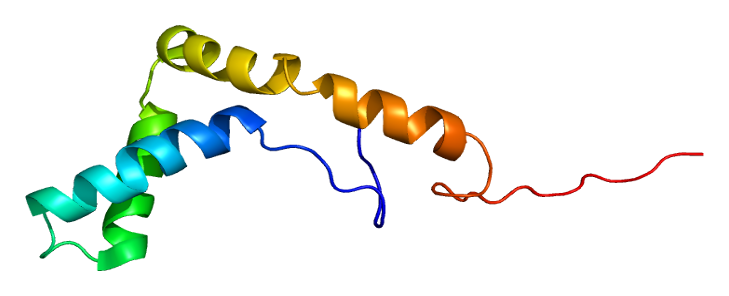
Available structures
PDB	Human UniProt search: PDBe RCSB
PDB	List of PDB id codes 2CS1

Identifiers
- Aliases: PMS1, HNPCC3, PMSL1, hMLH2, PMS1 homolog 1, mismatch repair system component
- External IDs: OMIM: 600258; MGI: 1202302; HomoloGene: 449; GeneCards: PMS1; OMA:PMS1 - orthologs

Gene location (Human)
Chr.	Chromosome 2 (human)
Band	2q32.2	Start	189,784,085 bp
Band	2q32.2	End	189,877,629 bp

Gene location (Mouse)
Chr.	Chromosome 1 (mouse)
Band	1|1 C1.1	Start	53,228,346 bp
Band	1|1 C1.1	End	53,336,177 bp
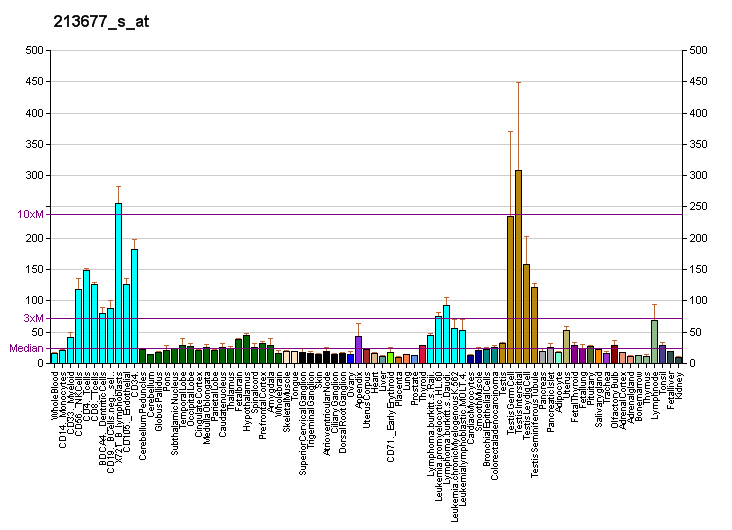
RNA expression pattern
Bgee	Human / Mouse (ortholog); Top expressed in: sperm; left testis; right testis; oocyte; endothelial cell; gonad; Achilles tendon; secondary oocyte; tibia; ventricular zone / Top expressed in: secondary oocyte; zygote; primary oocyte; hand; genital tubercle; tail of embryo; epiblast; primitive streak; foot; Paneth cell; More reference expression data
BioGPS	More reference expression data
Gene ontology
Molecular function	single-stranded DNA binding; DNA binding; ATP binding; mismatched DNA binding; ATPase activity; enzyme binding
Cellular component	MutLalpha complex; nucleus; mismatch repair complex
Biological process	DNA repair; cellular response to DNA damage stimulus; DNA mismatch repair
Sources:Amigo / QuickGO
Orthologs
Species	Human	Mouse
Entrez	5378	227099
Ensembl	ENSG00000064933	ENSMUSG00000026098
UniProt	P54277; Q5FBZ4	n/a
RefSeq (mRNA)	NM_000534; NM_001128143; NM_001128144; NM_001289408; NM_001289409 NM_001321044; NM_001321045; NM_001321046; NM_001321047; NM_001321048; NM_001321049; NM_001321051	NM_153556
RefSeq (protein)	NP_000525; NP_001121615; NP_001121616; NP_001276337; NP_001276338 NP_001307973; NP_001307974; NP_001307975; NP_001307976; NP_001307977; NP_001307978; NP_001307980	n/a
Location (UCSC)	Chr 2: 189.78 – 189.88 Mb	Chr 1: 53.23 – 53.34 Mb
PubMed search
- Wikidata
View/Edit Human	View/Edit Mouse

PMS1 protein homolog 1 is a protein that in humans is encoded by the PMS1 gene.

== Function ==
The protein encoded by this gene was identified by its homology to a yeast protein involved in DNA mismatch repair. A role for this protein in mismatch repair has not been proven. However, the protein forms heterodimers with MLH1, a DNA mismatch repair protein, and some cases of hereditary nonpolyposis colorectal cancer have been found to have mutations in this gene.

=== Yeast studies ===
In the yeast Saccharomyces cerevisiae, the MSH2, MLH1 and PMS1 proteins are required for repair of DNA base pair mismatches, thus contributing to mutation avoidance. The MLH1 and PMS1 proteins physically associate, likely forming a heterodimer which then interacts with the MSH2 protein to form a ternary complex that acts in the initiation of DNA mismatch repair. The nucleotide sequence of the PMS1 gene from S. cerevisiae has a 2,712-base pair open reading frame and a predicted molecular mass of 103 kilodaltons. The deduced amino acid sequence encoded by the PMS1 gene of S. cerevisiae exhibits homology to the sequences of the mutL gene of the bacteria Salmonella typimurium and the hexB gene of the bacteria Streptococcus pneumoniae, and these two genes are also required for DNA mismatch repair in their respective organisms.
