= Microsatellite instability =

Condition of genetic hypermutability

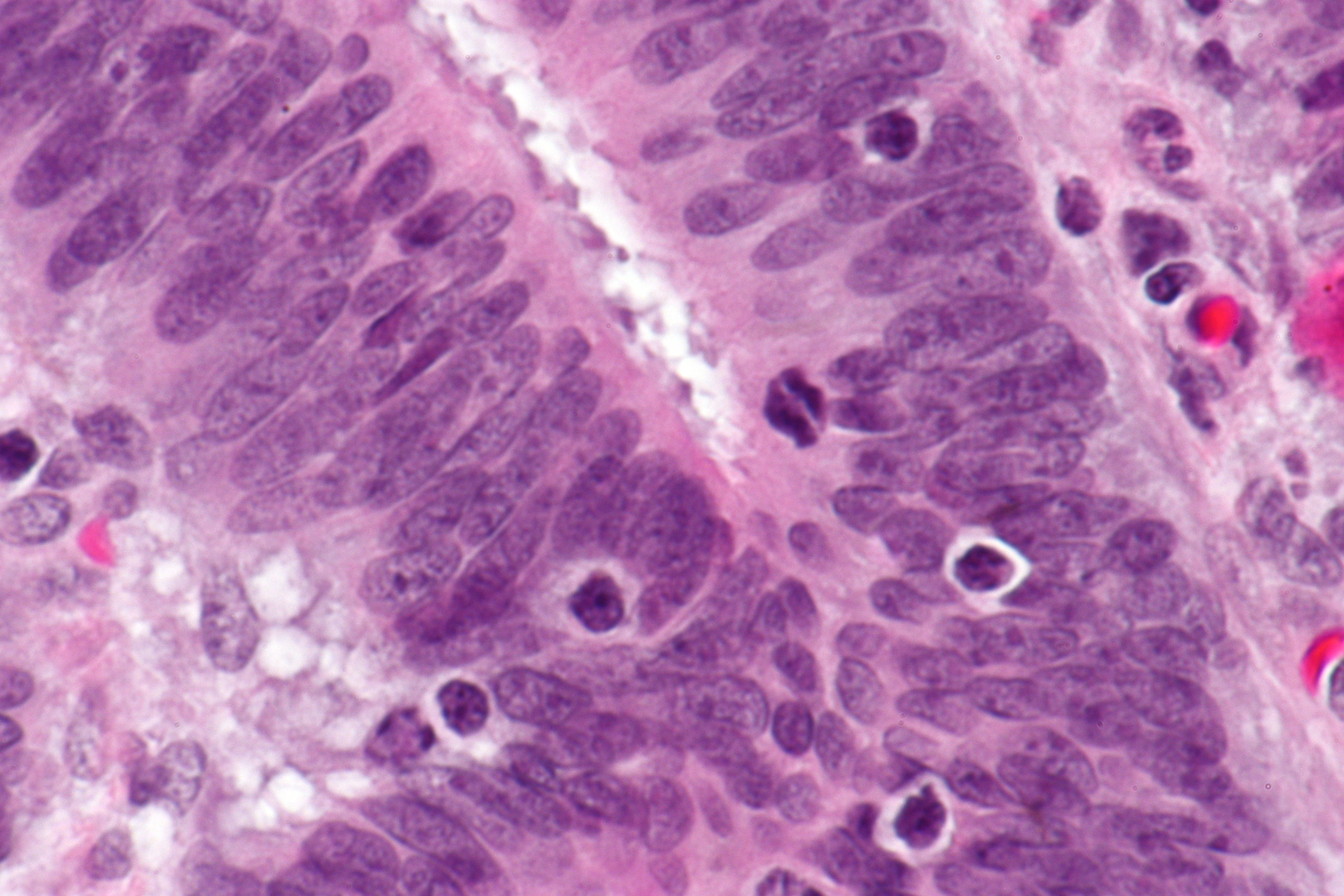
Micrograph showing tumor-infiltrating lymphocytes in a case of colorectal cancer with evidence of MSI-H on immunostaining. H&E stain.

Microsatellite instability (MSI) is the condition of genetic hypermutability (predisposition to mutation) that results from impaired DNA mismatch repair (MMR). The presence of MSI represents phenotypic evidence that MMR is not functioning normally.

MMR corrects errors that spontaneously occur during DNA replication, such as single base mismatches or short insertions and deletions. The proteins involved in MMR correct polymerase errors by forming a complex that binds to the mismatched section of DNA, excises the error, and inserts the correct sequence in its place. Cells with abnormally functioning MMR are unable to correct errors that occur during DNA replication and consequently accumulate errors. This causes the creation of novel microsatellite fragments. Polymerase chain reaction-based assays can reveal these novel microsatellites and provide evidence for the presence of MSI.

Microsatellites are repeated sequences of DNA. These sequences can be made of units of 1 to 6 base pairs in length that are repeated and reside adjacent to each other in the genome. Although the length of microsatellites can vary from person to person and contributes to the individual DNA "fingerprint", each individual has microsatellites of a set length. The most common microsatellite in humans is a dinucleotide repeat of the nucleotides C and A, which occurs tens of thousands of times across the genome. Microsatellites are also known as simple sequence repeats (SSRs).

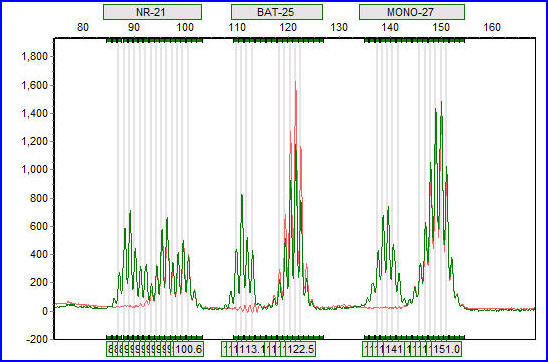
Example of Microsatellite Instability in a DNA Electropherogram Trace

== Structure ==
Microsatellite instability structure consists of repeated nucleotides, most often seen as GT/CA repeats.

Researchers have yet to confirm the precise definition of the MSI structure. While all researchers agree that microsatellites are repeat sequences, the lengths of the sequences remain in question. Some research suggests that MSIs are short tandem DNA repeat sequences of one to six base pairs throughout the genome, while other research suggests that the range may be two to five.

Although researchers do not agree on a specific threshold for the number of tandem repeats that constitute a microsatellite, there is a consensus around their relative size. Longer sequences are called minisatellite, and even longer sequences are called satellite DNA sites. Some scientists distinguish among the three categories by a minimum number of base pairs, and others use a minimum number of repeated units. The majority of repeats occur in untranslated regions, specifically introns. However, microsatellites that occur in coding regions often inhibit the expansion of most downstream events. Microsatellites make up approximately three percent of the human genome, or more than one million fragments of DNA. Microsatellite density increases with genome size and is seen twice as much at the ends of chromosome arms than in the chromosome bodies.

== Mechanism ==
MSI was discovered in 1993.

In a broad sense, MSI results from the inability of the mismatch repair (MMR) proteins to fix a DNA replication error. DNA replication occurs in the "S" phase of the cell cycle; the faulty event creating an MSI region occurs during the second replication event. The original strand is unharmed, but the daughter strand experiences a frame-shift mutation due to DNA polymerase slippage. Specifically, DNA polymerase slips, creating a temporary insertion-deletion loop, which is usually recognized by MMR proteins. However, when the MMR proteins do not function normally, as in the case of MSI, this loop results in frame-shift mutations, either through insertions or deletions, yielding non-functioning proteins.

MSI is unique to DNA polymorphisms in that the replication errors vary in length instead of sequence. The rate and direction of the mutations yielding MSIs are the major components in determining genetic differences. To date, scientists agree that the mutation rates differ in loci position. The greater the length of the MSI, the greater the mutation rate.

Although most mutations of MSI are the result of frame-shift mutations, occasionally the mutation events leading to MSI are derived from the hypermethylation of the hMLH1 (MMR protein) promoter. Hypermethylation occurs when a methyl group is added to a DNA nucleotide, resulting in gene silencing, thus yielding MSI.

Researchers have shown that oxidative damage yields frame-shift mutations, thus yielding MSI, but there is a lack of consensus on the precise mechanism. It has been shown that the more oxidative stress is placed on the system, the more likely it is that mutations will occur. Additionally, catalase reduces mutations, whereas copper and nickel increase mutations by increasing reduction of peroxides. Some researchers believe that the oxidative stress on specific loci results in DNA polymerase pausing at those sites, creating an environment for DNA slippage to occur.

Researchers first believed that MSI was random, but there is evidence suggesting that MSI targets include a growing list of genes. Examples include the transforming growth factor Beta receptor gene and the BAX gene. Each target leads to different phenotypes and pathologies.

It is thought that microsatellites that form in intronic/non-coding regions leads to the formation of secondary DNA structures (e.g. G-quadruplexes) that can lead to DNA damage and cell death if not repaired. This is exemplified by the dependency of the Werner syndrome helicase in MSI-H cancers.

== Clinical significance ==
Microsatellite instability is associated with colon cancer, gastric cancer, endometrium cancer, ovarian cancer, hepatobiliary tract cancer, urinary tract cancer, brain cancer, and skin cancers. MSI is most prevalent in associations with colon cancers. Each year, there are over 500,000 colon cancer cases worldwide. Based on findings from over 7,000 patients stratified for MSI-High (MSI-H), MSI-Low (MSI-L), or Microsatellite Stable (MSS) colon cancers, those with MSI-H tumours had a more positive prognosis by 15% compared to MSI-L or MSS tumors.

Colorectal tumors with MSI are found in the right colon, associated with poor differentiated tissue, high mucinogens, tumor infiltrating lymphocytes, and a presence of a Crohn's-like host response. MSI-H tumors contributing to colorectal cancer exhibit less metastasis than other derived colorectal cancer. This is demonstrated by previous research showing that MSI-H tumors are more representative in Stage II rather than Stage III cancers.

Scientists have explored the connection of vacuolar protein sorting (VPS) proteins to MSI. Like MSI, VPS is linked to gastric and colon cancers. One study reports that VPS proteins were linked to MSI-H cancers, but not MSI-L cancers, thus restricting VPS to MSI-H-specific cancers.

MSI-H status raises the possibility of Lynch syndrome, but MSI-H can also occur in patients without Lynch Syndrome and confirmation of Lynch Syndrome requires testing germline DNA. Lynch syndrome is associated with MSI and increases the risk for colon, endometrium, ovary, stomach, small intestine, hepatobiliary tract, urinary tract, brain, and skin cancers.

One study conducted over 120 Lynch syndrome patients attributing Crohn's like reaction (CLR) associated with MSI to "tumor specific neopeptides generated during MSI-H carcinogenesis." This study further corroborated that the "presence of antimetastatic immune protection in MSI-H CRC patients may explain recent findings that adjuvant 5-FU chemotherapy has no beneficial or even adverse effects in this collective." The researchers assume that there is a protective role of lymphocytes against the MSI-H CRC that prevents tumor metastasis.

MSI tumors in 15% of sporadic colorectal cancer result from the hypermethylation of the MLH 1 gene promoter, whereas MSI tumors in Lynch syndrome are caused by germline mutations in MLH1, MSH2, MSH6, and PMS2.

MSI has been evident in the cause of sebaceous carcinomas. Sebaceous carcinomas are a subset of a larger pathology, Muir-Torre syndrome. MSI is variably expressed in Muir-Torre syndrome, most often expressed with shared pathologies in patients with colon cancer. Furthermore, MMR proteins MLH 1, MSH 2, MSH6, and PMS2 are instrumental in periocular sebaceous carcinoma, which is seen on the eyelid in 40% of sebaceous carcinomas.

In May 2017 the FDA approved an immunotherapeutic called Keytruda (pembrolizumab) (PD-1 inhibitor) for patients with unresectable or metastatic microsatellite instability-high (MSI-H) or mismatch repair deficient (dMMR) solid tumors that have progressed following prior treatment. This indication is independent of PD-L1 expression assessment, tissue type and tumor location.

=== Microsatellite instability diagnostics ===
MSI is a good marker for detecting Lynch syndrome and determining a prognosis for cancer treatments. In 1996, the National Cancer Institute (NCI) hosted an international workshop on Lynch Syndrome, which led to the development of the "Bethesda Guidelines" and loci for MSI testing. During this first workshop the NCI has agreed on five microsatellite markers necessary to determine MSI presence: two mononucleotides, BAT25 and BAT26, and three dinucleotide repeats, D2S123, D5S346, and D17S250. MSI-H tumors result from MSI of greater than 30% of unstable MSI loci (>2 or more of the 5 loci). MSI-L tumors result from less than 30% of unstable MSI biomarkers. MSI-L tumors are classified as tumors of alternative etiologies. Several studies demonstrate that MSI-H patients respond best to surgery alone, rather than chemotherapy and surgery, thus preventing patients from needlessly experiencing chemotherapy.

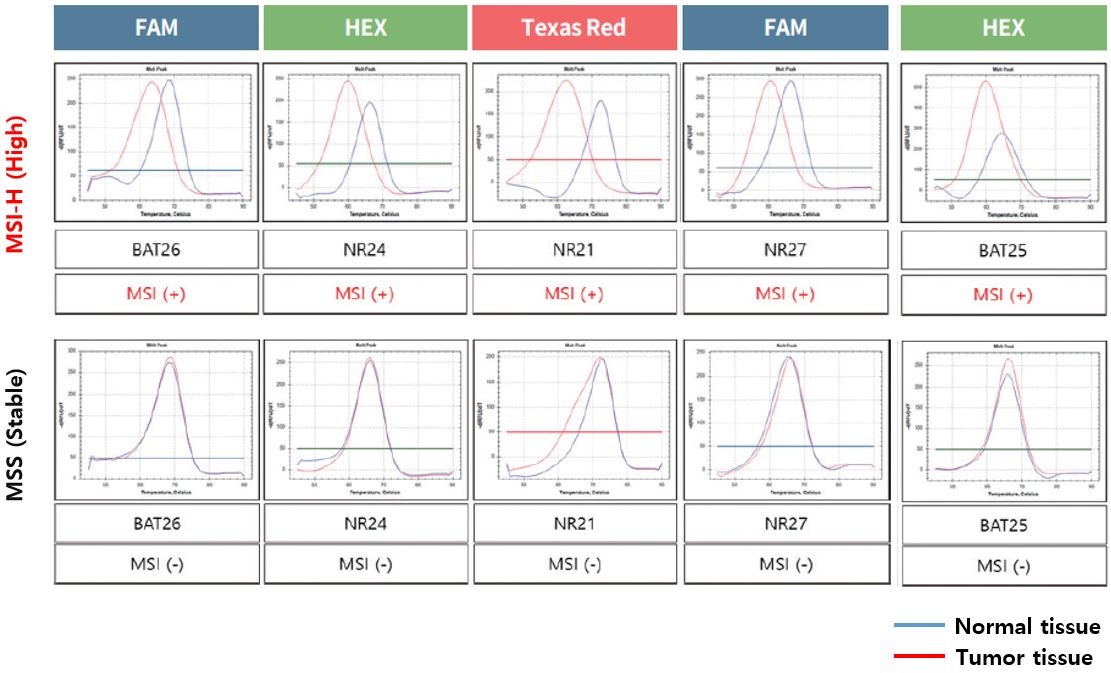
Detection of microsatellite instability by real-time PCR

Six years later, during the second NCI hosted workshop to revisit Lynch Syndrome in 2002, the Bethesda Guidelines were revised (later published in 2004) which recommended new criteria for MSI testing. Specifically, they identified the five mononucleotide loci as being superior, over the mixture of mono and dinucleotide loci because the dinucleotide loci could appear shifted, when in fact they were not, thus increasing the possibility of a false positive MSI-H result.

The first commercially available kit was provided by Promega Corporation, Madison, Wisconsin called the Microsatellite Instability 1.2 Analysis System (RUO). Since then, the Promega MSI RUO has been widely adopted since 2004, with over 120 peer-reviewed publications citing its global standing as the gold standard in determining the MSI status of cancer tissue.

Recently, real-time PCR based MSI detection kits have been introduced in the market successfully. Single step closed-tube format, high accuracy and sensitivity of the real-time PCR based products without any additional analysis after the PCR amplification comparing to the traditional (PCR followed with fragment analysis) methods has been considered as critical advantages.

Artificial intelligence has also been used to predict MSI from the appearance of tumors under the microscope. Digital pathology can be submitted to machine learning techniques and predictions about MSI can be made without any molecular testing. These methods have not yet shown results that are sufficient to incorporate in clinical care.

Direct and indirect mechanisms contribute to chemotherapy resistance. Direct mechanisms include pathways that metabolize the drug, while indirect mechanisms include pathways that respond to the chemotherapy treatment. The NER DNA repair pathway plays a substantial role in reversing cell damage caused by chemotherapeutic agents such as 5-FU.

=== Synthetic Lethality of WRN ===
It has been shown that MSI-H cancers are dependent on the Werner syndrome helicase (WRN) to repair the DNA secondary structures that are formed by expanded TA microsatellites. Because of this targeted therapeutic hypothesis, inhibition of WRN has become an area of high interest for the treatment of MSI-H malignancies. Two first-in-class WRN inhibitors, HRO761 (an allosteric inhibitor, Novartis) and VVD-133214 (a covalent inhibitor, Vividion Therapeutics and Roche) are currently undergoing clinical trials. Both of these inhibitors induce the degradation of WRN through similar mechanisms.

== Discoveries since 2010 ==
In May 2017 the FDA approved an immunotherapeutic called Keytruda (pembrolizumab) (PD-1 inhibitor) for patients with unresectable or metastatic microsatellite instability-high (MSI-H) or mismatch repair deficient (dMMR) solid tumors that have progressed following prior treatment. This indication is independent of PD-L1 expression assessment, tissue type and tumor location.

Researchers have found another MSI, called elevated microsatellite alterations at selected tetranucleotide repeats (EMAST). However, EMAST is unique in that it is not derived from MMR, and it is commonly associated with TP53 mutations.

EMAST is seen in a variety of cancers including those of the lung, head and neck, colorectal, skin, urinary tract, and the reproductive organs. External organ sites have more potential for EMAST. Some researchers believe that EMAST maybe a consequence of mutagenesis. EMAST positive margins in otherwise negative cancer margins suggest disease relapse for patients.
