= Germline mutation =

Inherited genetic variation

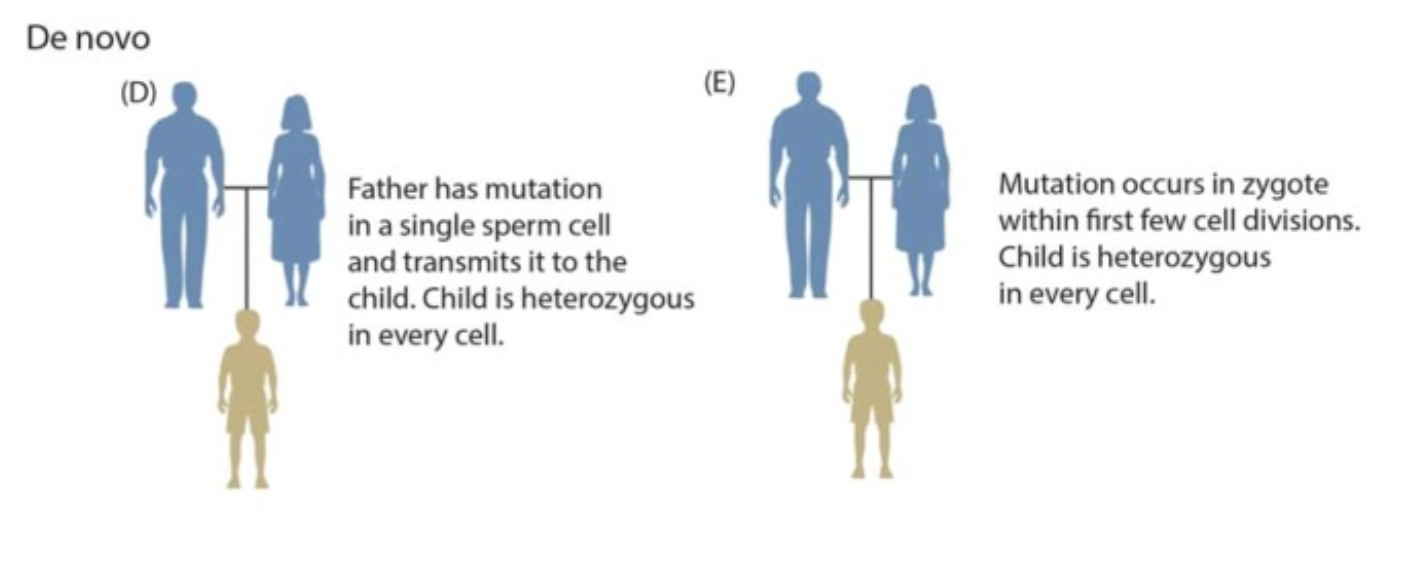
Transmittance of a de novo mutation in germ cells to offspring.

A germline mutation, or germinal mutation, is any detectable variation within germ cells (cells that, when fully developed, become sperm and ova). Mutations in these cells are the only mutations that can be passed on to offspring, when either a mutated sperm or oocyte come together to form a zygote. After this fertilization event occurs, germ cells divide rapidly to produce all of the cells in the body, causing this mutation to be present in every somatic and germline cell in the offspring; this is also known as a constitutional mutation. Germline mutation is distinct from somatic mutation.

Germline mutations can be caused by a variety of endogenous (internal) and exogenous (external) factors, and can occur throughout zygote development. A mutation that arises only in germ cells can result in offspring with a genetic condition that is not present in either parent; this is because the mutation is not present in the rest of the parents' body, only the germline.

== When mutagenesis occurs ==
Germline mutations can occur before fertilization and during various stages of zygote development. When the mutation arises will determine the effect it has on offspring. If the mutation arises in either the sperm or the oocyte before development, then the mutation will be present in every cell in the individual's body. A mutation that arises soon after fertilization, but before germline and somatic cells are determined, then the mutation will be present in a large proportion of the individual's cell with no bias towards germline or somatic cells, this is also called a gonosomal mutation. A mutation that arises later in zygote development will be present in a small subset of either somatic or germline cells, but not both.

== Causes ==
=== Endogenous factors ===
A germline mutation often arises due to endogenous factors, like errors in cellular replication and oxidative damage. This damage is rarely repaired imperfectly, but due to the high rate of germ cell division, can occur frequently.

Endogenous mutations are more prominent in sperm than in ova. This is because spermatocytes go through a larger number of cell divisions throughout a male's life, resulting in more replication cycles that could result in a DNA mutation. Errors in maternal ova also occur, but at a lower rate than in paternal sperm. The types of mutations that occur also tend to vary between the sexes. A mother's eggs, after production, remain in stasis until each is utilized in ovulation. This long stasis period has been shown to result in a higher number of chromosomal and large sequence deletions, duplications, insertions, and transversions. The father's sperm, on the other hand, undergoes continuous replication throughout his lifetime, resulting in many small point mutations that result from errors in replication. These mutations commonly include single base pair substitutions, deletions, and insertions.

Oxidative damage is another endogenous factor that can cause germline mutations. This type of damage is caused by reactive oxygen species that build up in the cell as a by-product of cellular respiration. These reactive oxygen species are missing an electron, and because they are highly electronegative (have a strong electron pull) they will rip an electron away from another molecule. This can initiate DNA damage because it causes the nucleic acid guanine to shift to 8-oxoguanine (8-oxoG). This 8-oxoG molecule is then mistaken for a thymine by DNA polymerase during replication, causing a G>T transversion on one DNA strand, and a C>A transversion on the other.

=== Male germline ===
In mice and humans the spontaneous mutation rate in the male germ line is significantly lower than in somatic cells. Furthermore, although the spontaneous mutation rate in the male germ line increases with age, the rate of increase is lower than in somatic tissues. Within the testicular spermatogonial stem cell population the integrity of DNA appears to be maintained by highly effective DNA damage surveillance and protective DNA repair processes. The progressive increase in the mutation rate with age in the male germ line may be a result of a decline in the accuracy of the repair of DNA damages, or of an increase in DNA replication errors. Once spermatogenesis is complete, the differentiated spermatozoa that are formed no longer have the capability for DNA repair, and are thus vulnerable to attack by prevalent oxidative free radicals that cause oxidative DNA damage. Such damaged spermatozoa may undergo programmed cell death (apoptosis).

=== Exogenous factors ===
A germline mutation can also occur due to exogenous factors. Similar to somatic mutations, germline mutations can be caused by exposure to harmful substances, which damage the DNA of germ cells. This damage can then either be repaired perfectly, and no mutations will be present, or repaired imperfectly, resulting in a variety of mutations. Exogenous mutagens include harmful chemicals and ionizing radiation; the major difference between germline mutations and somatic mutations is that germ cells are not exposed to UV radiation, and thus not often directly mutated in this manner.

== Clinical implications ==
Different germline mutations can affect an individual differently depending on the rest of their genome. A dominant mutation only requires a single mutated gene to produce the disease phenotype, while a recessive mutation requires both alleles to be mutated to produce the disease phenotype. For example, if the embryo inherits an already mutated allele from the father, and the same allele from the mother underwent an endogenous mutation, then the child will display the disease related to that mutated gene, even though only one parent carries the mutant allele. This is only one example of how a child can display a recessive disease while a mutant gene is only carried by one parent. Detection of chromosomal abnormalities can be found in utero for certain diseases by means of blood samples or ultrasound, as well as invasive procedures such as an amniocentesis. Later detection can be found by genome screening.

=== Cancer ===
Mutations in tumour suppressor genes or proto-oncogenes can predispose an individual to developing tumors. It is estimated that inherited genetic mutations are involved in 5-10% of cancers. These mutations make a person susceptible to tumor development if the other copy of the oncogene is randomly mutated. These mutations can occur in germ cells, allowing them to be heritable. Individuals who inherit germline mutations in TP53 are predisposed to certain cancer variants because the protein produced by this gene suppresses tumors. Patients with this mutation are also at a risk for Li–Fraumeni syndrome. Other examples include mutations in the BRCA1 and BRCA2 genes which predispose to breast and ovarian cancer, or mutations in MLH1 which predispose to hereditary non-polyposis colorectal cancer.

=== Huntington's disease ===
Huntington's disease is an autosomal dominant mutation in the HTT gene. The disorder causes degradation in the brain, resulting in uncontrollable movements and behavior. The mutation involves an expansion of repeats in the Huntingtin protein, causing it to increase in size. Patients who have more than 39 repeats will most likely be affected. The onset of the disease is determined by the amount of repeats present in the mutation; the greater the number of repeats, the earlier symptoms of the disease will appear. Because of the dominant nature of the mutation, only one mutated allele is needed for the disease to be in effect. This means that if one parent is affected, the child will have a 50% chance of inheriting the disease. This disease does not have carriers because if a patient has one mutation, they will (most likely) be affected. The disease typically has a late onset, so many parents have children before they know they have the mutation. The HTT mutation can be detected through genome screening.

=== Trisomy 21 ===
Trisomy 21 (also known as Down syndrome) results from a child having three copies of chromosome 21. This chromosome duplication occurs during germ cell formation, when both copies of chromosome 21 end up in the same daughter cell in either the mother or father, and this mutant germ cell participates in fertilization of the zygote. Another, more common way this can occur is during the first cell division event after the formation of the zygote. The risk of Trisomy 21 increases with maternal age with the risk being 1/2000 (0.05%) at age 20 increasing to 1/100 (1%) at age 40. This disease can be detected by non-invasive as well as invasive procedures prenatally. Non-invasive procedures include scanning for fetal DNA through maternal plasma via a blood sample.

=== Cystic fibrosis ===
Cystic fibrosis is an autosomal recessive disorder that causes a variety of symptoms and complications, the most common of which is a thick mucous lining in lung epithelial tissue due to improper salt exchange, but can also affect the pancreas, intestines, liver, and kidneys. Many bodily processes can be affected due to the hereditary nature of this disease; if the disease is present in the DNA of both the sperm and the egg, then it will be present in essentially every cell and organ in the body; these mutations can occur initially in the germline cells, or be present in all parental cells. The most common mutation seen in this disease is ΔF508, which means a deletion of the amino acid at the 508 position. If both parents have a mutated CFTR (cystic fibrosis transmembrane conductance regulator) protein, then their children have a 25% of inheriting the disease. If a child has one mutated copy of CFTR, they will not develop the disease, but will become a carrier of the disease. The mutation can be detected before birth through amniocentesis, or after birth via prenatal genetic screening.

== Current therapies ==
Many Mendelian disorders stem from dominant point mutations within genes, including cystic fibrosis, beta-thalassemia, sickle-cell anemia, and Tay–Sachs disease. By inducing a double stranded break in sequences surrounding the disease-causing point mutation, a dividing cell can use the non-mutated strand as a template to repair the newly broken DNA strand, getting rid of the disease-causing mutation. Many different genome editing techniques have been used for genome editing, and especially germline mutation editing in germ cells and developing zygotes; however, while these therapies have been extensively studied, their use in human germline editing is limited.

=== CRISPR/Cas9 editing ===
The CRISPR editing system is able to target specific DNA sequences and, using a donor DNA template, can repair mutations within this gene.

This editing system induces a double stranded break in the DNA, using a guide RNA and effector protein Cas9 to break the DNA backbones at specific target sequences. This system has shown a higher specificity than TALENs or ZFNs due to the Cas9 protein containing homologous (complementary) sequences to the sections of DNA surrounding the site to be cleaved. This broken strand can be repaired in 2 main ways: homologous directed repair (HDR) if a DNA strand is present to be used as a template (either homologous or donor), and if one is not, then the sequence will undergo non-homologous end joining (NHEJ). NHEJ often results in insertions or deletions within the gene of interest, due to the processing of the blunt strand ends, and is a way to study gene knockouts in a lab setting. This method can be used to repair a point mutation by using the sister chromosome as a template, or by providing a double stranded DNA template with the CRISPR/Cas9 machinery to be used as the repair template.

This method has been used in both human and animal models (Drosophila, Mus musculus, and Arabidopsis), and current research is being focused on making this system more specific to minimize off-target cleavage sites.

=== TALEN editing ===
The TALEN (transcription activator-like effector nucleases) genome editing system is used to induce a double-stranded DNA break at a specific locus in the genome, which can then be used to mutate or repair the DNA sequence. It functions by using a specific repeated sequence of an amino acid that is 33-34 amino acids in length. The specificity of the DNA binding site is determined by the specific amino acids at positions 12 and 13 (also called the Repeat Variable Diresidue (RVD)) of this tandem repeat, with some RVDs showing a higher specificity for specific amino acids over others. Once the DNA break is initiated, the ends can either be joined with NHEJ that induces mutations, or by HDR that can fix mutations.

=== ZFN editing ===
Similar to TALENs, zinc finger nucleases (ZFNs) are used to create a double stranded break in the DNA at a specific locus in the genome. The ZFN editing complex consists of a zinc finger protein (ZFP) and a restriction enzyme cleavage domain. The ZNP domain can be altered to change the DNA sequence that the restriction enzyme cuts, and this cleavage event initiates cellular repair processes, similar to that of CRISPR/Cas9 DNA editing.

Compared to CRISPR/Cas9, the therapeutic applications of this technology are limited, due to the extensive engineering required to make each ZFN specific to the desired sequence.

== See also ==
- Somatic mutation
- Genome Editing
