= MSH6 =

Protein-coding gene in Homo sapiens

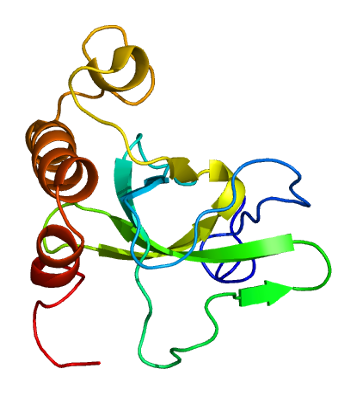

Identifiers
- Aliases: MSH6, mutS homolog 6, GTBP, GTMBP, HNPCC5, HSAP, p160, MMRCS3, MSH-6
- External IDs: OMIM: 600678; MGI: 1343961; GeneCards: MSH6
Available structures
PDB	Ortholog search: PDBe RCSB
PDB	List of PDB id codes 2O8F, 2GFU, 2O8B, 2O8C, 2O8D, 2O8E

Gene location (Human)
Chr.	Chromosome 2 (human)
Band	2p16.3	Start	47,695,530 bp
Band	2p16.3	End	47,810,063 bp

Gene location (Mouse)
Chr.	Chromosome 17 (mouse)
Band	17 E4|17 57.87 cM	Start	88,282,490 bp
Band	17 E4|17 57.87 cM	End	88,298,320 bp
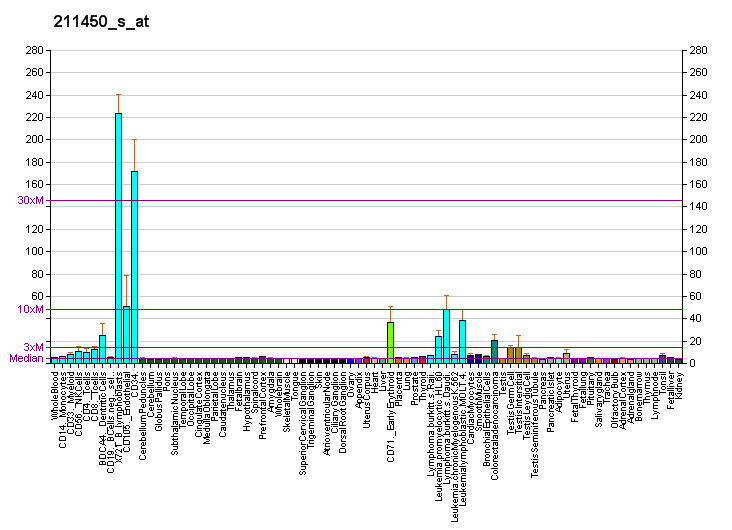

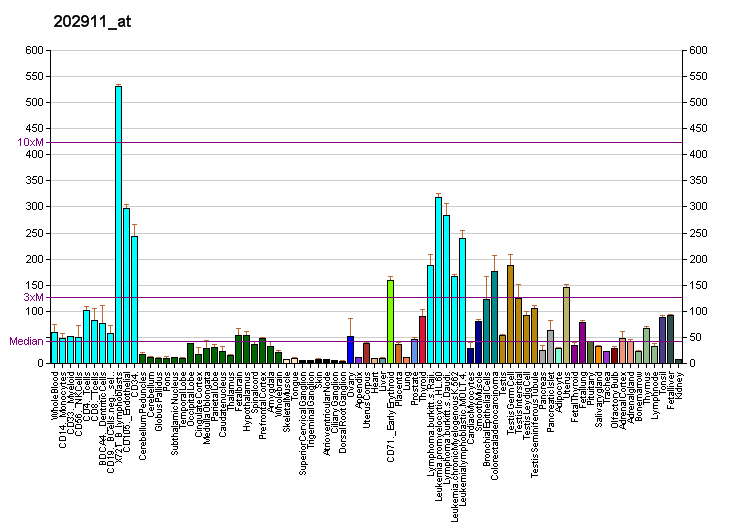
RNA expression pattern
Bgee	Human / Mouse (ortholog); Top expressed in: ventricular zone; embryo; ganglionic eminence; secondary oocyte; gonad; ovary; tendon of biceps brachii; left ovary; cartilage tissue; Achilles tendon / Top expressed in: zygote; epiblast; secondary oocyte; primitive streak; primary oocyte; tail of embryo; genital tubercle; abdominal wall; Gonadal ridge; thymus; More reference expression data
BioGPS	More reference expression data
Gene ontology
Molecular function	nucleotide binding; DNA binding; protein homodimerization activity; mismatched DNA binding; ADP binding; chromatin binding; oxidized purine DNA binding; methylated histone binding; damaged DNA binding; ATPase activity; protein binding; single thymine insertion binding; four-way junction DNA binding; MutLalpha complex binding; double-stranded DNA binding; ATP binding; magnesium ion binding; single guanine insertion binding; guanine/thymine mispair binding; ATP-dependent activity, acting on DNA; enzyme binding
Cellular component	Golgi apparatus; intracellular membrane-bounded organelle; MutSalpha complex; nucleoplasm; chromosome; nucleus; cytosol; mismatch repair complex
Biological process	determination of adult lifespan; cellular response to DNA damage stimulus; positive regulation of isotype switching; intrinsic apoptotic signaling pathway; maintenance of DNA repeat elements; positive regulation of helicase activity; somatic recombination of immunoglobulin gene segments; negative regulation of DNA recombination; DNA mismatch repair; viral process; DNA repair; meiotic mismatch repair; intrinsic apoptotic signaling pathway in response to DNA damage; response to UV; somatic hypermutation of immunoglobulin genes; isotype switching; pyrimidine dimer repair; mitotic G2 DNA damage checkpoint signaling; negative regulation of DNA endoreduplication; interstrand cross-link repair; replication fork arrest
Sources:Amigo / QuickGO
Orthologs
Databases	NCBI: entry; OMA: entry
Species	Human	Mouse
Entrez	2956	17688
Ensembl	ENSG00000116062	ENSMUSG00000005370
UniProt	P52701	P54276
RefSeq (mRNA)	NM_000179; NM_001281492; NM_001281493; NM_001281494	NM_010830
RefSeq (protein)	NP_000170; NP_001268421; NP_001268422; NP_001268423	NP_034960
Location (UCSC)	Chr 2: 47.7 – 47.81 Mb	Chr 17: 88.28 – 88.3 Mb
PubMed search
- Wikidata
View/Edit Human	View/Edit Mouse

MSH6 or mutS homolog 6 is a gene that codes for DNA mismatch repair protein Msh6 in the budding yeast Saccharomyces cerevisiae. It is the homologue of the human "G/T binding protein," (GTBP) also called p160 or hMSH6 (human MSH6). The MSH6 protein is a member of the Mutator S (MutS) family of proteins that are involved in DNA damage repair.

Defects in hMSH6 are associated with atypical hereditary nonpolyposis colorectal cancer not fulfilling the Amsterdam criteria for HNPCC. hMSH6 mutations have also been linked to endometrial cancer and the development of endometrial carcinomas.

== Discovery ==
MSH6 was first identified in the budding yeast S. cerevisiae because of its homology to MSH2. The identification of the human GTBP gene and subsequent amino acid sequence availability showed that yeast MSH6 and human GTBP were more related to each other than any other MutS homolog, with a 26.6% amino acid identity. Thus, GTBP took on the name human MSH6, or hMSH6.

== Structure ==
In the human genome, hMSH6 is located on chromosome 2. It contains the Walker-A/B adenine nucleotide binding motif, which is the most highly conserved sequence found in all MutS homologs. As with other MutS homologs, hMSH6 has an intrinsic ATPase activity. It functions exclusively when bound to hMSH2 as a heterodimer, although hMSH2 itself can function as a homomultimer or as a heterodimer with hMSH3.

== Function ==
=== Importance of mismatch repair ===
Mismatches commonly occur as a result of DNA replication errors, genetic recombination, or other chemical and physical factors. Recognizing those mismatches and repairing them is extremely important for cells, because failure to do so results in microsatellite instability, an elevated spontaneous mutation rate (mutator phenotype), and susceptibility to HNPCC. hMSH6 combines with hMSH2 to form the active protein complex, hMutS alpha, also called hMSH2-hMSH6.

=== Mismatch recognition ===
Mismatch recognition by this complex is regulated by the ADP to ATP transformation, which provides evidence that hMutS alpha complex functions as a molecular switch. In normal DNA, adenine (A) bonds with thymine (T) and cytosine (C) bonds with guanine (G). Sometimes there will be a mismatch where T will bind with G, which is called a G/T mismatch. When a G/T mismatch is recognized, hMutS alpha complex binds and exchanges ADP for ATP. The ADP-->ATP exchange causes a conformational change to convert hMutS alpha into a sliding clamp that can diffuse along the DNA backbone. The ATP induces a release of the complex from the DNA and allows the hMutS alpha to dissociate along the DNA like a sliding clamp. This transformation helps trigger downstream events to repair the damaged DNA.

== Cancer ==
Although mutations in hMSH2 cause a strong general mutator phenotype, mutations in hMSH6 cause only a modest mutator phenotype. At the gene level, the mutations were found to cause primarily single-base substitution mutations, which suggests that the role of hMSH6 is primarily for correcting single-base substitution mutations and to a lesser extent single base insertion/deletion mutations.

Mutations in the hMSH6 gene cause the protein to be nonfunctional or only partially active, thus reducing its ability to repair mistakes in DNA. The loss of MSH6 function results in instability at mononucleotide repeats. HNPCC is most commonly caused by mutations in hMSH2 and hMLH1, but mutations in hMSH6 are linked to an atypical form of HNPCC. The penetrance of colorectal cancer seems to be lower in these mutations, meaning that a low proportion of hMSH6 mutation carriers present with the disease. Endometrial cancer, on the other hand, seems to be a more important clinical manifestation for female mutation carriers. The onset of endometrial cancer and also colon cancer in families with hMSH6 mutations is about 50 years. This is delayed compared to the age 44 onset of hMSH2-related tumors.

== Epigenetic control of MSH6 in cancer ==
Two microRNAs, miR21 and miR-155, target the DNA mismatch repair (MMR) genes hMSH6 and hMSH2, to cause reduced expression of their proteins. If one or the other of these two microRNAs is over-expressed, hMSH2 and hMSH6 proteins are under-expressed, resulting in reduced DNA mismatch repair and increased microsatellite instability.

One of these microRNAs, miR21, is regulated by the epigenetic methylation state of the CpG islands in one or the other of its two promoter regions. Hypomethylation of its promoter region is associated with increased expression of an miRNA. High expression of a microRNA causes repression of its target genes (see microRNA silencing of genes). In 66% to 90% of colon cancers, miR-21 was over-expressed, and generally the measured level of hMSH2 was decreased (and hMSH6 is unstable without hMSH2).

The other microRNA, miR-155, is regulated both by epigenetic methylation of the CpG islands in its promoter region and by epigenetic acetylation of histones H2A and H3 at the miR-155 promoter (where acetylation increases transcription). Measured by two different methods, miR-155 was over-expressed in sporadic colorectal cancers by either 22% or 50%. When miR-155 was elevated, hMSH2 was under-expressed in 44% to 67% of the same tissues (and hMSH6 is likely under-expressed as well, and also unstable in the absence of hMSH2).

== Interactions ==
MSH6 has been shown to interact with MSH2, PCNA and BRCA1.

== See also ==
- Mismatch repair § MutS homologs
- Lynch syndrome – Inherited condition raising colon cancer risk
