= MSH2 =

Protein found in humans

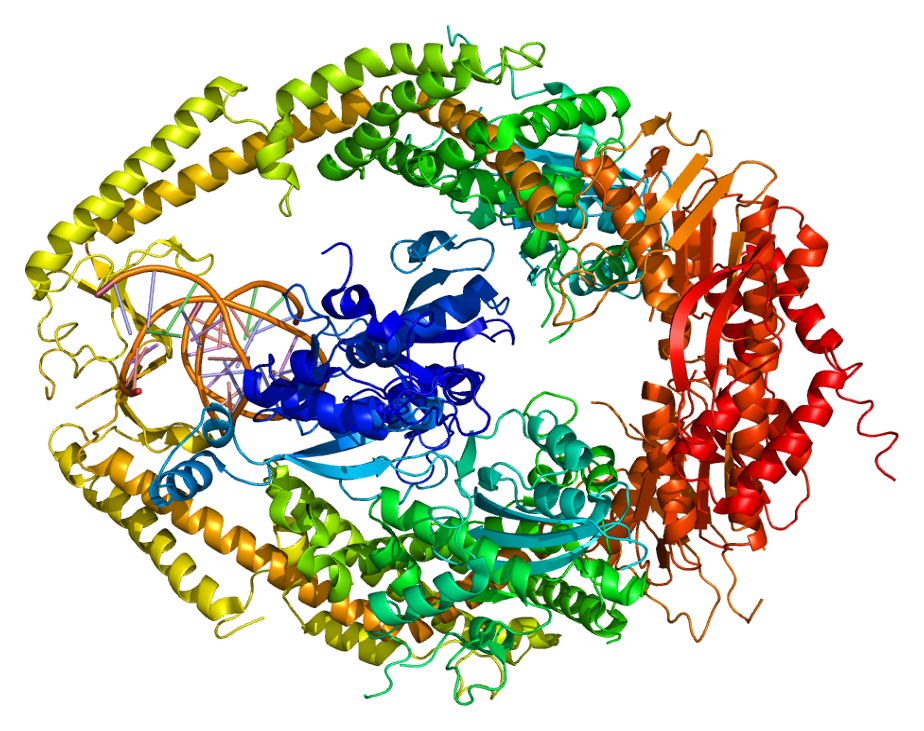

Identifiers
- Aliases: MSH2, mutS homolog 2, COCA1, FCC1, HNPCC, HNPCC1, LCFS2, hMMRCS2, MSH-2
- External IDs: OMIM: 609309; MGI: 101816; GeneCards: MSH2
Available structures
PDB	Ortholog search: PDBe RCSB
PDB	List of PDB id codes 2O8B, 2O8C, 2O8D, 2O8E, 2O8F, 3THW, 3THX, 3THY, 3THZ

Gene location (Human)
Chr.	Chromosome 2 (human)
Band	2p21-p16.3	Start	47,403,067 bp
Band	2p21-p16.3	End	47,663,146 bp

Gene location (Mouse)
Chr.	Chromosome 17 (mouse)
Band	17 E4|17 57.87 cM	Start	87,979,758 bp
Band	17 E4|17 57.87 cM	End	88,031,141 bp
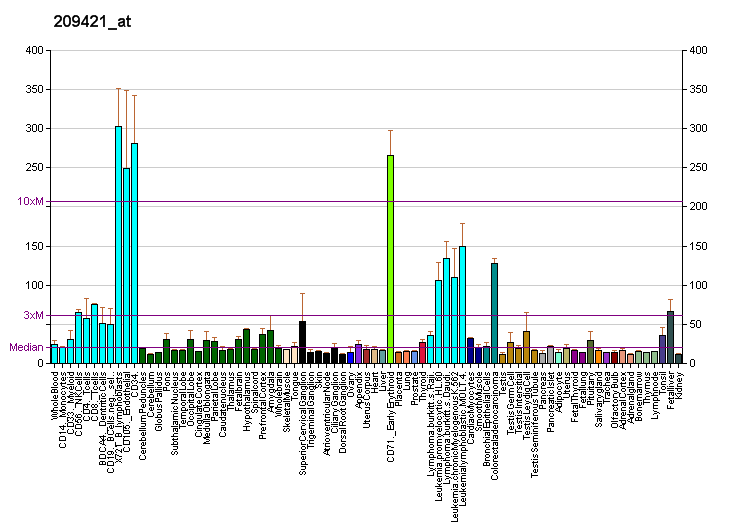
RNA expression pattern
Bgee	Human / Mouse (ortholog); Top expressed in: secondary oocyte; ventricular zone; ganglionic eminence; gonad; retinal pigment epithelium; testicle; middle frontal gyrus; Brodmann area 10; rectum; cerebellar hemisphere / Top expressed in: primitive streak; saccule; epiblast; otic placode; otic vesicle; tail of embryo; somite; zygote; secondary oocyte; abdominal wall; More reference expression data
BioGPS	More reference expression data
Gene ontology
Molecular function	DNA binding; nucleotide binding; protein homodimerization activity; mismatched DNA binding; dinucleotide insertion or deletion binding; ADP binding; centromeric DNA binding; oxidized purine DNA binding; single-stranded DNA binding; damaged DNA binding; ATPase activity; protein C-terminus binding; protein binding; single thymine insertion binding; four-way junction DNA binding; MutLalpha complex binding; enzyme binding; double-stranded DNA binding; dinucleotide repeat insertion binding; ATP binding; protein kinase binding; magnesium ion binding; single guanine insertion binding; guanine/thymine mispair binding; Y-form DNA binding; heteroduplex DNA loop binding; double-strand/single-strand DNA junction binding; ATP-dependent activity, acting on DNA; chromatin binding
Cellular component	MutSbeta complex; membrane; MutSalpha complex; nucleoplasm; mismatch repair complex; nucleus; chromosome
Biological process	negative regulation of neuron apoptotic process; germ cell development; male gonad development; postreplication repair; determination of adult lifespan; in utero embryonic development; cellular response to DNA damage stimulus; oxidative phosphorylation; maintenance of DNA repeat elements; positive regulation of helicase activity; somatic recombination of immunoglobulin gene segments; intrinsic apoptotic signaling pathway in response to DNA damage; negative regulation of DNA recombination; somatic recombination of immunoglobulin genes involved in immune response; DNA mismatch repair; B cell differentiation; B cell mediated immunity; DNA repair; positive regulation of isotype switching to IgA isotypes; positive regulation of isotype switching to IgG isotypes; double-strand break repair; meiotic gene conversion; response to X-ray; response to UV-B; somatic hypermutation of immunoglobulin genes; mitotic intra-S DNA damage checkpoint signaling; intrinsic apoptotic signaling pathway in response to DNA damage by p53 class mediator; negative regulation of reciprocal meiotic recombination; isotype switching; protein localization to chromatin; DNA recombination
Sources:Amigo / QuickGO
Orthologs
Databases	NCBI: entry; OMA: entry
Species	Human	Mouse
Entrez	4436	17685
Ensembl	ENSG00000095002	ENSMUSG00000024151
UniProt	P43246	P43247
RefSeq (mRNA)	NM_000251; NM_001258281	NM_008628
RefSeq (protein)	NP_000242; NP_001245210	NP_032654
Location (UCSC)	Chr 2: 47.4 – 47.66 Mb	Chr 17: 87.98 – 88.03 Mb
PubMed search
- Wikidata
View/Edit Human	View/Edit Mouse

DNA mismatch repair protein Msh2 also known as MutS homolog 2 or MSH2 is a protein that in humans is encoded by the MSH2 gene, which is located on chromosome 2. MSH2 is a tumor suppressor gene and more specifically a caretaker gene that codes for a DNA mismatch repair (MMR) protein, MSH2, which forms a heterodimer with MSH6 to make the human MutSα mismatch repair complex. It also dimerizes with MSH3 to form the MutSβ DNA repair complex. MSH2 is involved in many different forms of DNA repair, including transcription-coupled repair, homologous recombination, and base excision repair.

Mutations in the MSH2 gene are associated with microsatellite instability and some cancers, especially with hereditary nonpolyposis colorectal cancer (HNPCC). At least 114 disease-causing mutations in this gene have been discovered.

== Clinical significance ==
Hereditary nonpolyposis colorectal cancer (HNPCC), sometimes referred to as Lynch syndrome, is inherited in an autosomal dominant fashion, where inheritance of only one copy of a mutated mismatch repair gene is enough to cause disease phenotype. Mutations in the MSH2 gene account for 40% of genetic alterations associated with this disease and is the leading cause, together with MLH1 mutations. Mutations associated with HNPCC are broadly distributed in all domains of MSH2, and hypothetical functions of these mutations based on the crystal structure of the MutSα include protein–protein interactions, stability, allosteric regulation, MSH2-MSH6 interface, and DNA binding. Mutations in MSH2 and other mismatch repair genes cause DNA damage to go unrepaired, resulting in an increase in mutation frequency. These mutations build up over a person's life that otherwise would not have occurred had the DNA been repaired properly.

== Microsatellite instability ==
The viability of MMR genes including MSH2 can be tracked via microsatellite instability, a biomarker test that analyzes short sequence repeats which are very difficult for cells to replicate without a functioning mismatch repair system. Because these sequences vary in the population, the actual number of copies of short sequence repeats does not matter, just that the number the patient does have is consistent from tissue to tissue and over time. This phenomenon occurs because these sequences are prone to mistakes by the DNA replication complex, which then need to be fixed by the mismatch repair genes. If these are not working, over time either duplications or deletions of these sequences will occur, leading to different numbers of repeats in the same patient.

71% of HNPCC patients show microsatellite instability. Detection methods for microsatellite instability include polymerase chain reaction (PCR) and immunohistochemical (IHC) methods, polymerase chain checking the DNA and immunohistochemical surveying mismatch repair protein levels. "Currently, there are evidences that universal testing for MSI starting with either IHC or PCR-based MSI testing is cost effective, sensitive, specific and is generally widely accepted."

== Role in mismatch repair ==
In eukaryotes from yeast to humans, MSH2 dimerizes with MSH6 to form the MutSα complex, which is involved in base mismatch repair and short insertion/deletion loops. MSH2 heterodimerization stabilizes MSH6, which is not stable because of its N-terminal disordered domain. Conversely, MSH2 does not have a nuclear localization sequence (NLS), so it is believed that MSH2 and MSH6 dimerize in the cytoplasm and then are imported into the nucleus together. In the MutSα dimer, MSH6 interacts with the DNA for mismatch recognition while MSH2 provides the stability that MSH6 requires. MSH2 can be imported into the nucleus without dimerizing to MSH6, in this case, MSH2 is probably dimerized to MSH3 to form MutSβ. MSH2 has two interacting domains with MSH6 in the MutSα heterodimer, a DNA interacting domain, and an ATPase domain.

The MutSα dimer scans double stranded DNA in the nucleus, looking for mismatched bases. When the complex finds one, it repairs the mutation in an ATP dependent manner. The MSH2 domain of MutSα prefers ADP to ATP, with the MSH6 domain preferring the opposite. Studies have indicated that MutSα only scans DNA with the MSH2 domain harboring ADP, while the MSH6 domain can contain either ADP or ATP. MutSα then associates with MLH1 to repair the damaged DNA.

MutSβ is formed when MSH2 complexes with MSH3 instead of MSH6. This dimer repairs longer insertion/deletion loops than MutSα. Because of the nature of the mutations that this complex repairs, this is probably the state of MSH2 that causes the microsatellite instability phenotype. Large DNA insertions and deletions intrinsically bend the DNA double helix. The MSH2/MSH3 dimer can recognize this topology and initiate repair. The mechanism by which it recognizes mutations is different as well, because it separates the two DNA strands, which MutSα does not.

== Double-strand break repair ==
Msh2 modulates accurate homologous recombination, a prominent DNA double-strand break repair pathway in mammalian chromosomes. Repair of DNA double-strand breaks by accurate homologous recombination predominates over the inaccurate double-strand break repair pathway of "non-homologous end joining" in hamster, mouse and human somatic cells.

== Interactions ==
MSH2 has been shown to interact with:

- ATR,
- BRCA1,
- CHEK2,
- EXO1,
- MAX,
- MSH3,
- MSH6, and
- p53.

== Epigenetic MSH2 deficiencies in cancer ==
DNA damage appears to be the primary underlying cause of cancer, and deficiencies in expression of DNA repair genes appear to underlie many forms of cancer. If DNA repair is deficient, DNA damage tends to accumulate. Such excess DNA damage may increase mutations due to error-prone translesion synthesis and error prone repair (see e.g. microhomology-mediated end joining). Elevated DNA damage may also increase epigenetic alterations due to errors during DNA repair. Such mutations and epigenetic alterations may give rise to cancer.

Reductions in expression of DNA repair genes (usually caused by epigenetic alterations) are very common in cancers, and are ordinarily much more frequent than mutational defects in DNA repair genes in cancers. (See Frequencies of epimutations in DNA repair genes.) In a study of MSH2 in non-small cell lung cancer (NSCLC), no mutations were found while 29% of NSCLC had epigenetic reduction of MSH2 expression. In acute lymphoblastoid leukemia (ALL), no MSH2 mutations were found while 43% of ALL patients showed MSH2 promoter methylation and 86% of relapsed ALL patients had MSH2 promoter methylation. There were, however, mutations in four other genes in ALL patients that destabilized the MSH2 protein, and these were defective in 11% of children with ALL and 16% of adults with this cancer.

Methylation of the promoter region of the MSH2 gene is correlated with the lack of expression of the MSH2 protein in esophageal cancer, in non-small-cell lung cancer, and in colorectal cancer. These correlations suggest that methylation of the promoter region of the MSH2 gene reduces expression of the MSH2 protein. Such promoter methylation would reduce DNA repair in the four pathways in which MSH2 participates: DNA mismatch repair, transcription-coupled repair homologous recombination, and base excision repair. Such reductions in repair likely allow excess DNA damage to accumulate and contribute to carcinogenesis.

The frequencies of MSH2 promoter methylation in several different cancers are indicated in the Table.

MSH2 promoter methylation in sporadic cancers
Cancer	Frequency of MSH2 promoter methylation	Ref.
Acute lymphoblastic leukemia	43%	
Relapsed Acute lymphoblastic leukemia	86%	
Renal cell carcinoma	51–55%	
Esophageal squamous cell carcinoma	29–48%	
Head and neck squamous-cell carcinoma	27–36%	
Non-small cell lung cancer	29–34%	
Hepatocellular carcinoma	10–29%	
Colorectal cancer	3–24%	
Soft-tissue sarcoma	8%	

== See also ==
- Mismatch repair#MutS homologs
