= EME1 =

Protein-coding gene in the species Homo sapiens

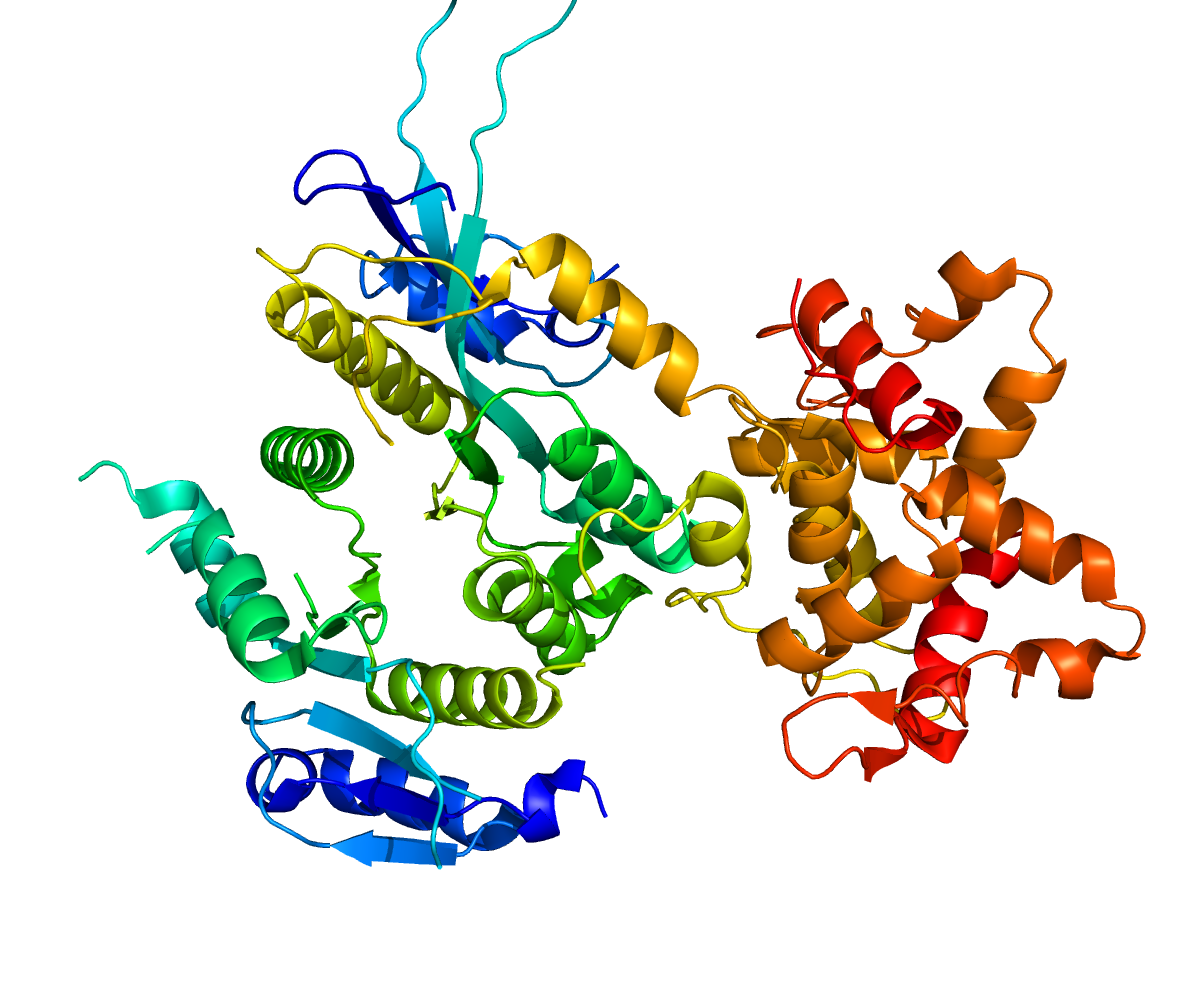
Available structures
PDB	Ortholog search: PDBe RCSB
PDB	List of PDB id codes 2ZIU, 2ZIV, 2ZIW, 2ZIX, 4P0P, 4P0Q, 4P0R, 4P0S

Identifiers
- Aliases: EME1, MMS4L, SLX2A, essential meiotic structure-specific endonuclease 1
- External IDs: OMIM: 610885; MGI: 3576783; HomoloGene: 16123; GeneCards: EME1; OMA:EME1 - orthologs

Gene location (Human)
Chr.	Chromosome 17 (human)
Band	17q21.33	Start	50,373,220 bp
Band	17q21.33	End	50,381,483 bp

Gene location (Mouse)
Chr.	Chromosome 11 (mouse)
Band	11|11 D	Start	94,535,822 bp
Band	11|11 D	End	94,544,790 bp
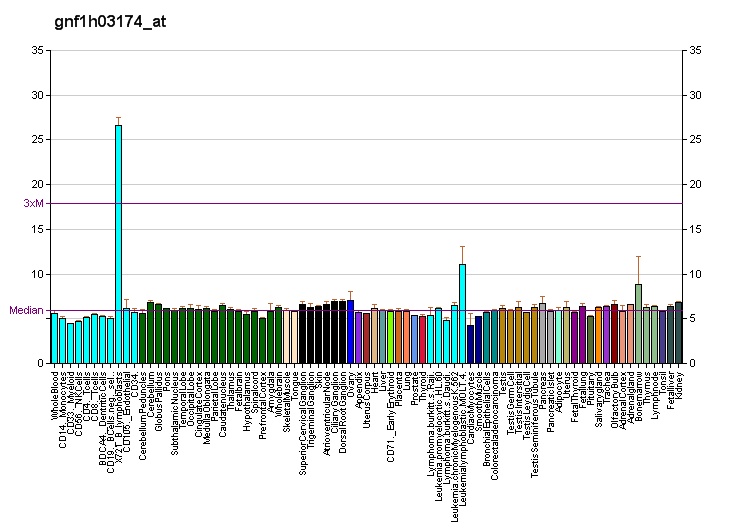

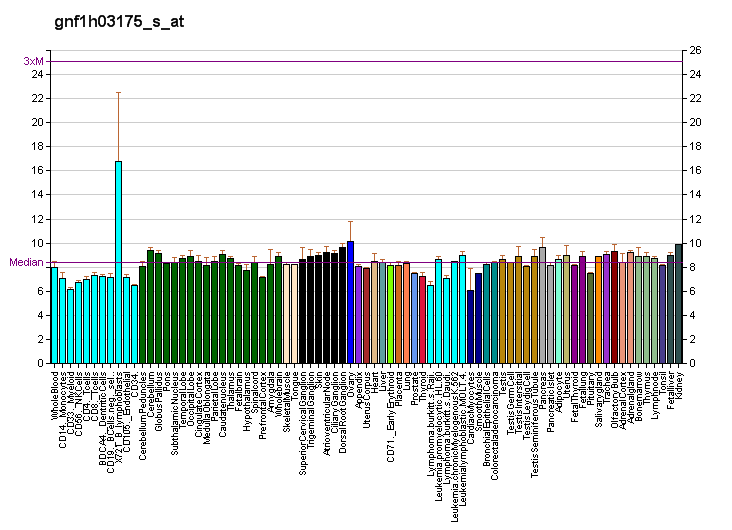
RNA expression pattern
Bgee	Human / Mouse (ortholog); Top expressed in: tail of epididymis; corpus epididymis; tendon of biceps brachii; mucosa of ileum; pancreatic ductal cell; oocyte; endothelial cell; right testis; left testis; secondary oocyte / Top expressed in: lateral part of occipital bone; genital tubercle; tail of embryo; epiblast; somite; yolk sac; thyroid cartilage; maxillary prominence; mandibular prominence; sphenoid bone; More reference expression data
BioGPS	More reference expression data
Gene ontology
Molecular function	DNA binding; endonuclease activity; nuclease activity; protein binding; hydrolase activity; metal ion binding; endodeoxyribonuclease activity; crossover junction endodeoxyribonuclease activity
Cellular component	nucleolus; nucleoplasm; nucleus; Holliday junction resolvase complex
Biological process	cellular response to DNA damage stimulus; DNA recombination; interstrand cross-link repair; nucleic acid phosphodiester bond hydrolysis; response to intra-S DNA damage checkpoint signaling; DNA repair; resolution of meiotic recombination intermediates; double-strand break repair; replication fork processing; mitotic intra-S DNA damage checkpoint signaling
Sources:Amigo / QuickGO
Orthologs
Species	Human	Mouse
Entrez	146956	268465
Ensembl	ENSG00000154920	ENSMUSG00000039055
UniProt	Q96AY2	Q8BJW7
RefSeq (mRNA)	NM_001166131; NM_152463	NM_177752; NM_001379688
RefSeq (protein)	NP_001159603; NP_689676	NP_808420; NP_001366617
Location (UCSC)	Chr 17: 50.37 – 50.38 Mb	Chr 11: 94.54 – 94.54 Mb
PubMed search
- Wikidata
View/Edit Human	View/Edit Mouse

Crossover junction endonuclease EME1 is an enzyme that is encoded by the EME1 gene in humans. It forms a complex with MUS81 which resolves Holliday junctions. In mammalian cells the EME1/MUS81 protein complex is redundant for DNA damage repair with GEN1 endonuclease. In mice, EME1/MUS81 and GEN1 redundantly contribute to Holliday junction processing. When homozygous mutations of Gen1 and Eme1 were combined in mice the result was synthetic lethality at an early embryonic stage. Homozygosity for Gen1 mutations did not cause a DNA repair deficiency in mice. But when mice were both homozygous mutant for Gen1 and also heterozygous for an Emc1 mutation, they showed increased sensitivity to DNA damaging agents. This finding, indicated a redundant role of GEN1 and EME1 in DNA repair. Gen1 and Emc1 were also shown to have redundant roles in meiotic recombination.
