= David Lilley (biochemist) =

British biophysical chemist

David MJ Lilley FRS FRSE FRSC
- Born: 28 May 1948 (age 78); United Kingdom
- Education: University of Durham(Undergraduate)(PhD)
- Awards: Royal Society of Chemistry Khorana Prize (2016); RNA Society Lifetime Service Award (2015); Royal Society of Chemistry, Interdisciplinary Award (2006); Fellow of the Royal Society (2002); The Prelog Medal in Stereochemistry (1996); The Gold Medal of G. Mendel (1994); Fellow of the Royal Society of Edinburgh (1988)
- Scientific career
- Fields: Holliday Junction, FRET, Structure of RNA, Ribozymes
- Workplaces: University of Dundee
- Thesis: Theoretical and experimental investigations of structure, reactivity and bonding in some organic systems
- Website: https://www.dundee.ac.uk/people/david-lilley

David Malcolm James Lilley FRS (born 28 May 1948) is a British biophysical chemist. He is Professor of Molecular Biology at the University of Dundee. He is also a visiting professor at Nankai University and Sun Yat-sen University.

Lilley is an expert in the structure and folding of nucleic acids, including specialised branched structures of DNA. His lab was the first to resolve the structure of the DNA Holliday junction and has since conducted extensive research on Holliday-junction resolving enzymes. Lilley has also carried out research in ribozyme catalysis and structures, as well as kink turns (k-turns) in RNA. He was elected a Fellow of the Royal Society in 2002.

He graduated from Durham University in 1969 with a first-class degree in Chemistry, and finished his PhD in Physical Chemistry at the same institution in 1972. He was the Colworth Medal winner in 1982, and from 1996 to 2001 served as Editor of Gene.

== Honours and awards ==
- 1982: Awarded the Colworth Medal
- 1984: Made a member of the European Molecular Biology Organisation
- 1988: Fellow of the Royal Society of Edinburgh
- 1994: Awarded the Gold Medal of G. Mendel of the Czech Academy of Sciences
- 1996: Awarded the Prelog Medal in Stereochemistry, Zurich, Switzerland
- 2002: RNA and Ribozyme Chemistry Award of The Royal Society of Chemistry
- 2002: Fellow of the Royal Society
- 2006: Royal Society of Chemistry, Interdisciplinary Award
- 2015: RNA Society Lifetime Service Award
- 2016: Royal Society of Chemistry Khorana Prize
