= D-loop replication =

Hypothetical DNA replication mechanism used by some circular chromosomes

D-loop replication is a proposed process by which circular DNA molecules like those found in many (though not all) chloroplasts and mitochondria replicate their genetic material. These circular chromosomes often contain D-loops, short regions of triple-stranded DNA where the double-stranded duplex molecule is opened and one of the strands is displaced by a third, independent strand of variable length. Not all circular genomes use D-loop replication, however, nor do all chloroplasts and mitochondria use circular chromosomes; in those with linear chromosomes, D-loop replication does not occur.

== Background ==
In most double-stranded DNA molecules, one of the two strands tends to be composed of heavier nucleotides with higher molecular weights (i.e. relatively more purines: adenine and guanine). This strand is called the H (heavy) strand. The complementary L (light) strand comprises lighter nucleotides (i.e. the pyrimidines: thymine and cytosine). Replication begins with replication of the heavy strand starting at the D-loop (also known as the control region). This structure consists of an intervening third strand which is complementary to the light strand and displaces the heavy strand to form a displacement loop (D-loop). Circular DNA is stable with this small D-loop and can remain in this formation more or less indefinitely, but the middle strand, or the displacing strand, must be replaced frequently due to its short half-life, which is very energetically expensive to the cell. When diagrammed, the resulting structure looks like the letter D. The D-loop was first discovered in 1971 when researchers noticed that many DNA in the mitochondria they were examining under the microscope contained a short segment that was triple-stranded.

== Replication process ==
Each D-loop contains an origin of replication for the heavy strand. Full circular DNA replication is initiated at that origin and replicates in only one direction. The middle strand in the D-loop can be removed and a new one will be synthesized that is not terminated until the heavy strand is fully replicated, or until the middle strand can serve as a primer for the heavy strand's replication. As the heavy strand's replication reaches the origin of replication for the light strand, a new light strand will be synthesized in the direction opposite to that of the heavy strand.

There is more than one proposed process through which D-loop replication occurs, but in all of the models, these steps are agreed upon. The portions not agreed upon regard the importance of maintaining a D-loop when replication is not in progress, because it is energetically expensive to the cell, and what mechanisms, during replication, preserve the detached strand of DNA that is waiting to be replicated.

== Importance ==
The D-loop region is important for phylogeographic studies. Because the region does not code for any genes, it is not imperative for this region to remain conserved over time; therefore, it is free to mutate with only a few selective limitations on size and heavy/light strand factors. The mutation rate for the D-loop region is among the fastest in either the nuclear or mitochondrial genomes in animals. Using these mutations in the D-loop, recent and rapid evolutionary changes can effectively be tracked such as within species and among very closely related species. Due to the high mutation rate, it is not effective in tracking evolutionary changes that are not recent. This is a very common use of the D-loop in genomics.

One example of the use of D-loop mutations in phylogeographic studies was the phylogeny assembled using the largely unstudied Iberian red deer. Scientists tracked D-loop polymorphisms within these red deer and determined the genetic relationship that these deer had among each other. They were also able to determine the relationships, based on D-loop similarities and differences, between these red deer and other species of deer throughout Europe. In another example, scientists used variations in the D-loop, along with microsatellite markers, to study and map genetic diversity among goats in Sri Lanka.

== See also ==
- D-loop
- Mitochondrial DNA—useful in organisation of the nucleoid of mitochondria
- Organelle
