= Crossover junction endodeoxyribonuclease =

Identifiers
- EC no.: 3.1.22.4
- CAS no.: 99676-43-4

Databases
- BRENDA: enzyme data
- ExPASy: NiceZyme view
- KEGG: enzyme entry
- MetaCyc: metabolic pathway
- Rhea: reactions
- PDB structures: RCSB PDB PDBe PDBsum
Search
- PMC: articles
- PubMed: articles
- NCBI: proteins

Holliday junction resolvases

Identifiers
- Symbol: PDDEXK
- Pfam clan: CL0236
- ECOD: 2008.1.1

Crossover junction endodeoxyribonuclease, also known as Holliday junction resolvase, Holliday junction endonuclease, Holliday junction-cleaving endonuclease, Holliday junction-resolving endoribonuclease, crossover junction endoribonuclease, and cruciform-cutting endonuclease, is an enzyme involved in DNA repair and homologous recombination. Specifically, it performs endonucleolytic cleavage that results in single-stranded crossover between two homologous DNA molecules at the Holliday junction to produce recombinant DNA products for chromosomal segregation. This process is known as Holliday junction resolution.

== Biological Function ==
The Holliday junction is a structure that forms during genetic recombination, and links two double-stranded DNA molecules with a single-stranded crossover, which form during mitotic and meiotic recombination. Crossover junction endodeoxyribonucleases catalyze Holiday junction resolution, which is the formation of separate recombinant DNA molecules and chromosomal separation after the crossover event at the Holliday junction. Crossover junction endodeoxyribonucleases with Holliday Junction resolution function have been identified in all three domains of life - bacteria, archaea, and eukarya. RuvC in bacteria, CCE1 in Saccharomyces cerevisiae, and GEN1 in humans are all crossover junction endodeoxyribonucleases that perform Holliday Junction resolution. Holliday junction resolution catalyzed by crossover junction endodeoxyribonuclease is shown in the figure below.

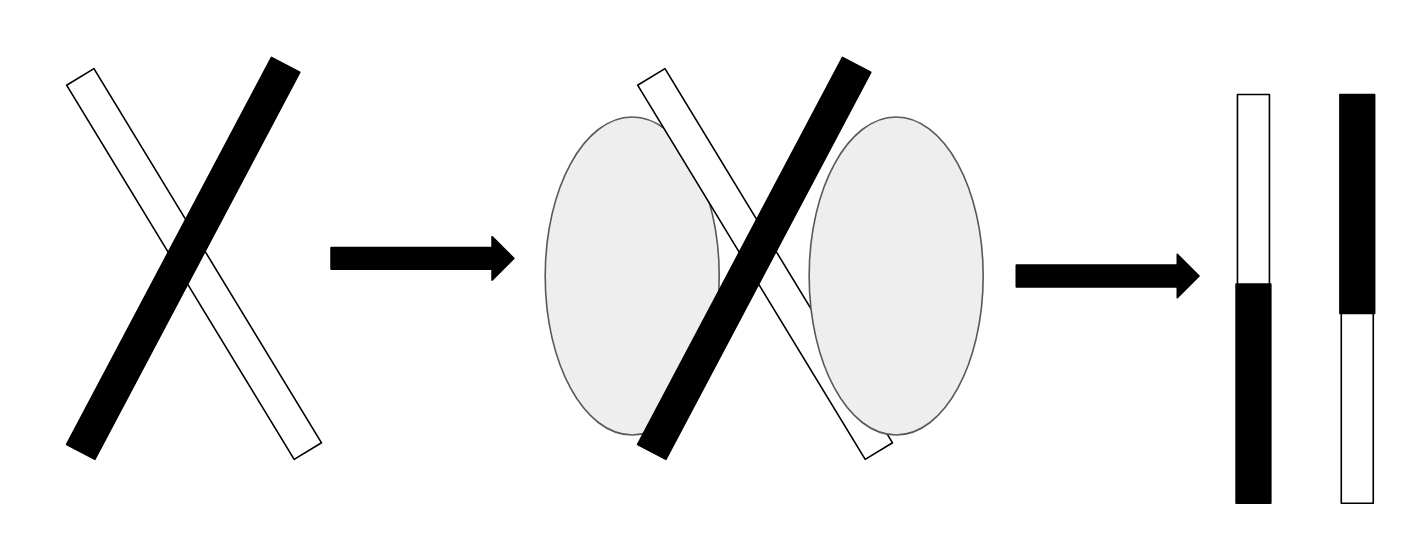
Holliday junction resolution catalyzed by crossover junction endodeoxyribonuclease. Left: First, four strands of DNA (two black and two white) combine to form two double stranded DNA molecules at a Holliday junction. Center: Next, substrate form a complex with crossover junction endodeoxyribonuclease complex for Holliday junction resolution. Right: Finally, completion of Holliday Junction Resolution results in recombinant DNA. Diagram generated based on Wyatt et al.

Crossover junction endodeoxyribonucleases also play key roles in DNA repair. During cell growth and meiosis, DNA double-strand breaks (DSBs) often occur, and are usually repaired by homologous recombination. Because Crossover junction endodeoxyribonucleases perform Holliday Junction resolution, a crucial step of homologous recombination, they are therefore involved in repair of DSBs.

== Structure ==
E. coli RuvC, a Crossover junction endodeoxyribonuclease, is a small protein of about 20 kD, and its active form is a dimer that requires and binds a magnesium ion [1]. RuvC is a 3-layer alpha-beta sandwich with a beta-sheet between 5 alpha-helices . The enzyme contains two binding channels that contact the backbones of the Holliday junction over seven nucleotides. A Holliday junction resolvase enzyme has also been identified in archaea in Pyrococcus furiosus cells - it is encoded by a gene called hjc and is composed of 123 amino acids .

A figure of Thermus thermophilus RuvC in complex with a Holliday junction is shown below.

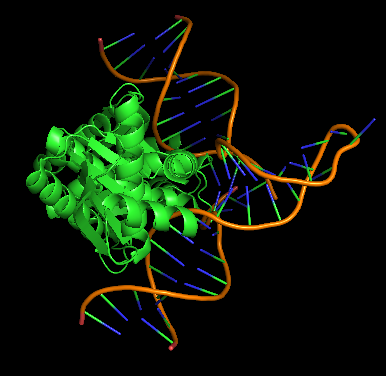
Archaea crossover junction endodeoxyribonuclease in complex with Holliday Junction DNA. Generated with 4LD0.pdb.

== Mechanism ==
These enzymes are highly selective for branched DNA, although induced fit occurs in the enzyme-substrate (resolvase-Holloday Junction) complex formation. Much remains unknown about the exact mechanism of action, but it is known that bacteria, bacteriophages and archaea catalyze Holliday junction resolution by introducing symmetric nicks across the Holliday junction . Analysis of crossover junction endodeoxyribonucleases from bacteriophages (T7 endonuclease I), bacteria (RuvC), fungi (GEN1) and humans (hMus81-Eme1) have revealed that the enzymes function in dimers, and part of the resolution reaction takes place in a partially dissociated enzyme-substrate intermediate.

== Human Relevance ==
After a 20-year search, in 2008, a human crossover junction endodeoxyribonuclease, GEN1, was finally identified . GEN1 performs similar functions and operates by similar mechanisms as previously studied Crossover junction endodeoxyribonuclease in bacteria, archaea, and other eukarya. The enzyme is thought to play a role in Bloom's syndrome. It has been proposed that Bloom's syndrome involves the induction of DSBs via an unidentified Holliday junction resolvase. It has also been shown that overexpression of Holliday Junction resolvase function is correlated with RAD51-overexpressing cancers.
