= Exonuclease 1 =

Protein found in humans

EXO1

Identifiers
- Aliases: EXO1, HEX1, hExoI, exonuclease 1
- External IDs: OMIM: 606063; MGI: 1349427; GeneCards: EXO1
Available structures
PDB	Ortholog search: PDBe RCSB
PDB	List of PDB id codes 3QE9, 3QEA, 3QEB

Gene location (Human)
Chr.	Chromosome 1 (human)
Band	1q43	Start	241,847,967 bp
Band	1q43	End	241,895,148 bp

Gene location (Mouse)
Chr.	Chromosome 1 (mouse)
Band	1 H4|1 81.9 cM	Start	175,708,147 bp
Band	1 H4|1 81.9 cM	End	175,741,055 bp
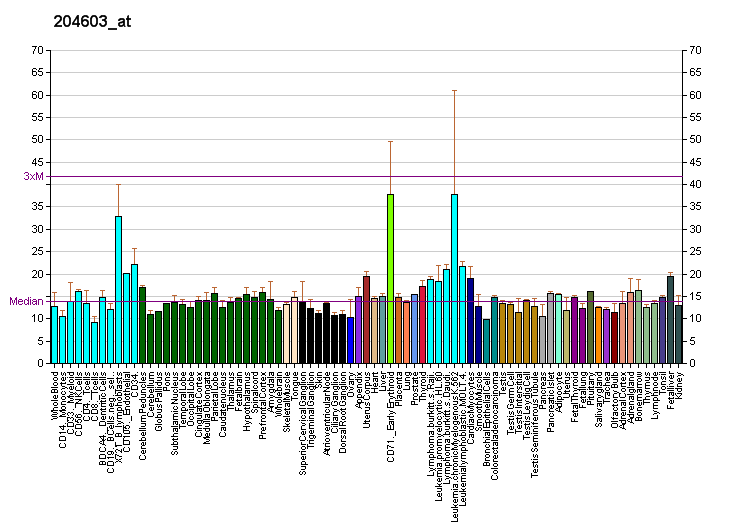
RNA expression pattern
Bgee	Human / Mouse (ortholog); Top expressed in: ventricular zone; gonad; ganglionic eminence; testicle; trabecular bone; bone marrow; bone marrow cell; stromal cell of endometrium; secondary oocyte; mucosa of transverse colon / Top expressed in: epiblast; primary oocyte; zygote; embryo; nasolacrimal duct; morula; secondary oocyte; embryo; spermatocyte; tail of embryo; More reference expression data
BioGPS	More reference expression data
Gene ontology
Molecular function	endonuclease activity; double-stranded DNA 5'-3' exodeoxyribonuclease activity; single-stranded DNA 5'-3' exodeoxyribonuclease activity; DNA binding; 5'-3' exonuclease activity; nuclease activity; RNA-DNA hybrid ribonuclease activity; protein binding; 5'-3' exodeoxyribonuclease activity; flap endonuclease activity; chromatin binding; exonuclease activity; hydrolase activity, acting on ester bonds; catalytic activity; hydrolase activity; metal ion binding; double-stranded DNA binding; 5'-flap endonuclease activity
Cellular component	nucleus; nucleoplasm; nuclear body; plasma membrane
Biological process	DNA recombination; immune system process; humoral immune response mediated by circulating immunoglobulin; DNA mismatch repair; cellular response to DNA damage stimulus; somatic hypermutation of immunoglobulin genes; meiosis; isotype switching; DNA repair; RNA phosphodiester bond hydrolysis, endonucleolytic; nucleic acid phosphodiester bond hydrolysis; DNA replication; t-circle formation; meiotic DNA double-strand break processing; regulation of signal transduction by p53 class mediator
Sources:Amigo / QuickGO
Orthologs
Databases	NCBI: entry; OMA: entry
Species	Human	Mouse
Entrez	9156	26909
Ensembl	ENSG00000174371	ENSMUSG00000039748
UniProt	Q9UQ84; Q5T397	Q9QZ11
RefSeq (mRNA)	NM_003686; NM_006027; NM_130398; NM_001319224	NM_012012
RefSeq (protein)	NP_001306153; NP_003677; NP_006018; NP_569082	NP_036142
Location (UCSC)	Chr 1: 241.85 – 241.9 Mb	Chr 1: 175.71 – 175.74 Mb
PubMed search
- Wikidata
View/Edit Human	View/Edit Mouse

Exonuclease 1 is an enzyme that in humans is encoded by the EXO1 gene.

This gene encodes a protein with 5' to 3' exonuclease activity as well as RNase activity (endonuclease activity cleaving RNA on DNA/RNA hybrid). It is similar to the Saccharomyces cerevisiae protein Exo1 which interacts with Msh2 and which is involved in DNA mismatch repair and homologous recombination. Alternative splicing of this gene results in three transcript variants encoding two different isoforms.

== Meiosis ==
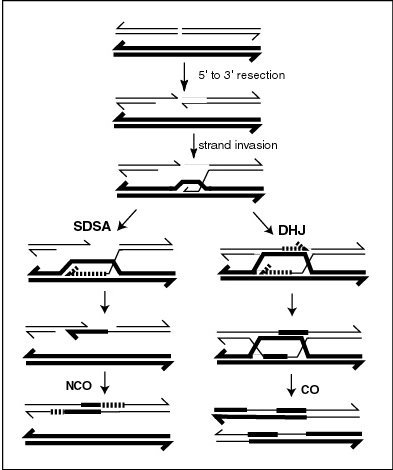
A current model of meiotic recombination, initiated by a double-strand break or gap, followed by pairing with an homologous chromosome and strand invasion to initiate the recombinational repair process. Repair of the gap can lead to crossover (CO) or non-crossover (NCO) of the flanking regions. CO recombination is thought to occur by the Double Holliday Junction (DHJ) model, illustrated on the right, above. NCO recombinants are thought to occur primarily by the Synthesis Dependent Strand Annealing (SDSA) model, illustrated on the left, above. Most recombination events appear to be the SDSA type.

ExoI is essential for meiotic progression through metaphase I in the budding yeast Saccharomyces cerevisiae and in mouse.

Recombination during meiosis is often initiated by a DNA double-strand break (DSB) as illustrated in the accompanying diagram. During recombination, sections of DNA at the 5' ends of the break are cut away in a process called resection. In the strand invasion step that follows, an overhanging 3' end of the broken DNA molecule "invades" the DNA of a homologous chromosome that is not broken, forming a displacement loop (D-loop). After strand invasion, the further sequence of events may follow either of two main pathways leading to a crossover (CO) or a non-crossover (NCO) recombinant (see Genetic recombination and Homologous recombination). The pathway leading to a CO involves a double Holliday junction (DHJ) intermediate. Holliday junctions need to be resolved for CO recombination to be completed.

During meiosis in S. cerevisiae, transcription of the Exo1 gene is highly induced. In meiotic cells, Exo1 mutation reduces the processing of DSBs and the frequency of COs. Exo1 has two temporally and biochemically distinct functions in meiotic recombination. First, Exo1 acts as a 5’–3’ nuclease to resect DSB-ends. Later in the recombination process, Exo1 acts to facilitate the resolution of DHJs into COs, independently of its nuclease activities. In resolving DHJs, Exo 1 acts together with MLH1-MLH3 heterodimer (MutL gamma) and Sgs1 (ortholog of Bloom syndrome helicase) to define a joint molecule resolution pathway that produces the majority of crossovers.

Male mice deficient for Exo1 are capable of normal progress through the pachynema stage of meiosis, but most germ cells fail to progress normally to metaphase I due to dynamic loss of chiasmata. However, this meiotic role of Exo1 is not mediated by its nuclease activity per se, since Exo1-DA mice harboring a point mutation in Exo1's nuclease domain have no detectable meiotic defects.

== Interactions ==
Exonuclease 1 has been shown to interact with MSH2 and MLH1.
