= MLH3 =

Protein-coding gene in humans

Identifiers
- Aliases: MLH3, HNPCC7, mutL homolog 3
- External IDs: OMIM: 604395; MGI: 1353455; HomoloGene: 91153; GeneCards: MLH3; OMA:MLH3 - orthologs

Gene location (Human)
Chr.	Chromosome 14 (human)
Band	14q24.3	Start	75,013,769 bp
Band	14q24.3	End	75,051,532 bp

Gene location (Mouse)
Chr.	Chromosome 12 (mouse)
Band	12|12 D1	Start	85,281,294 bp
Band	12|12 D1	End	85,317,373 bp
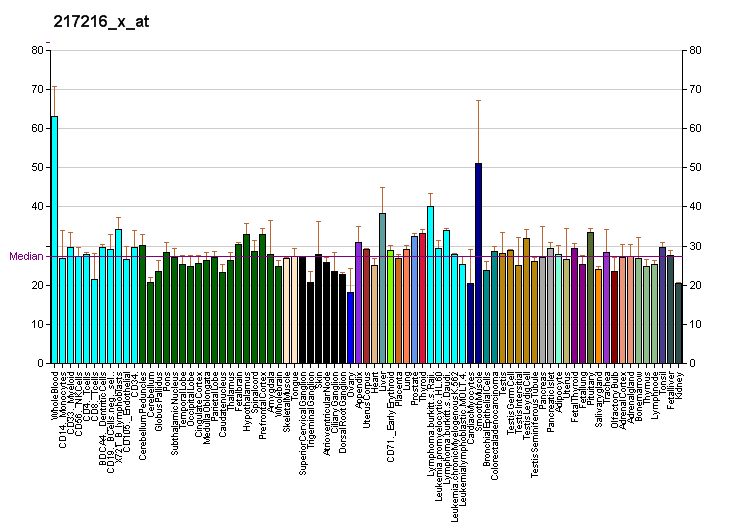

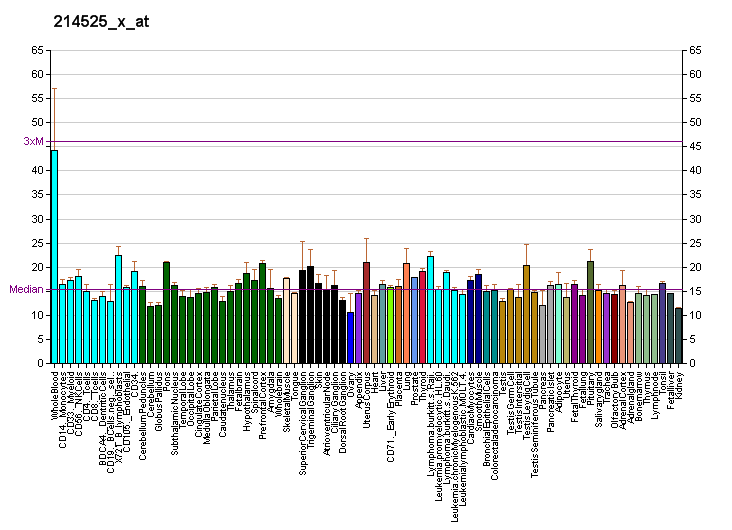

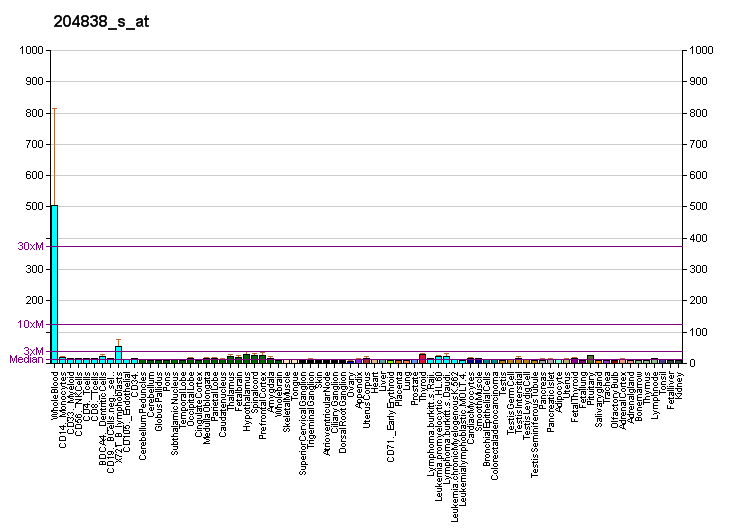
RNA expression pattern
Bgee	Human / Mouse (ortholog); Top expressed in: monocyte; ventricular zone; Achilles tendon; epithelium of colon; right lobe of thyroid gland; left lobe of thyroid gland; granulocyte; right adrenal cortex; tibial nerve; gastric mucosa / Top expressed in: tail of embryo; spermatocyte; genital tubercle; interventricular septum; muscle of thigh; ascending aorta; renal corpuscle; neural layer of retina; olfactory epithelium; dentate gyrus of hippocampal formation granule cell; More reference expression data
BioGPS	More reference expression data
Gene ontology
Molecular function	mismatched DNA binding; chromatin binding; centromeric DNA binding; single-stranded DNA binding; protein binding; satellite DNA binding; ATP binding; ATPase activity
Cellular component	chiasma; male germ cell nucleus; condensed nuclear chromosome; mismatch repair complex; synaptonemal complex; nucleus; condensed chromosome; MutLalpha complex
Biological process	protein localization; reciprocal meiotic recombination; male meiotic nuclear division; cellular response to DNA damage stimulus; synaptonemal complex assembly; DNA repair; female meiosis I; DNA mismatch repair
Sources:Amigo / QuickGO
Orthologs
Species	Human	Mouse
Entrez	27030	217716
Ensembl	ENSG00000119684	ENSMUSG00000021245
UniProt	Q9UHC1	n/a
RefSeq (mRNA)	NM_001040108; NM_014381	NM_145446; NM_175337; NM_001304475
RefSeq (protein)	NP_001035197; NP_055196	n/a
Location (UCSC)	Chr 14: 75.01 – 75.05 Mb	Chr 12: 85.28 – 85.32 Mb
PubMed search
- Wikidata
View/Edit Human	View/Edit Mouse

DNA mismatch repair protein Mlh3 is a protein that in humans is encoded by the MLH3 gene.

== Function ==
This gene is a member of the MutL-homolog (MLH) family of DNA mismatch repair (MMR) genes. MLH genes are implicated in maintaining genomic integrity during DNA replication and after meiotic recombination. The protein encoded by this gene functions as a heterodimer with other family members. MLH3, as part of the MLH1-MLH3 (MutL gamma) complex, has also been implicated in pathogenic trinucleotide repeat expansion, and reduced MLH3 expression slowed GAA/TTC repeat expansion in a human Friedreich ataxia cell model. Somatic mutations in this gene frequently occur in tumors exhibiting microsatellite instability, and germline mutations have been linked to hereditary nonpolyposis colorectal cancer type 7 (HNPCC7). Several alternatively spliced transcript variants have been identified, but the full-length nature of only two transcript variants has been determined. Orthologs of human MLH3 have also been studied in other organisms including mouse and the budding yeast Saccharomyces cerevisiae.

== Meiosis ==
In addition to its role in DNA mismatch repair, MLH3 protein is also involved in meiotic crossing over. MLH3 forms a heterodimer with MLH1 that appears to be necessary for mouse oocytes to progress through metaphase II of meiosis.

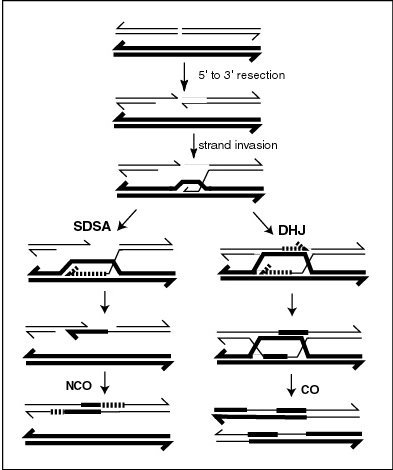
A current model of meiotic recombination, initiated by a double-strand break or gap, followed by pairing with an homologous chromosome and strand invasion to initiate the recombinational repair process. Repair of the gap can lead to crossover (CO) or non-crossover (NCO) of the flanking regions. CO recombination is thought to occur by the Double Holliday Junction (DHJ) model, illustrated on the right, above. NCO recombinants are thought to occur primarily by the Synthesis Dependent Strand Annealing (SDSA) model, illustrated on the left, above. Most recombination events appear to be the SDSA type.

The MLH1-MLH3 heterodimers promote crossovers. Recombination during meiosis is often initiated by a DNA double-strand break (DSB) as illustrated in the accompanying diagram. During recombination, sections of DNA at the 5' ends of the break are cut away in a process called resection. In the strand invasion step that follows, an overhanging 3' end of the broken DNA molecule then "invades" the DNA of a homologous chromosome that is not broken forming a displacement loop (D-loop). After strand invasion, the further sequence of events may follow either of two main pathways leading to a crossover (CO) or a non-crossover (NCO) recombinant (see Genetic recombination. The pathway leading to a CO involves a double Holliday junction (DHJ) intermediate. Holliday junctions need to be resolved for CO recombination to be completed.

In the budding yeast Saccharomyces cerevisiae, as in the mouse, MLH3 forms a heterodimer with MLH1. Meiotic CO requires resolution of Holliday junctions through actions of the MLH1-MLH3 heterodimer. The MLH1-MLH3 heterodimer is an endonuclease that makes single-strand breaks in supercoiled double-stranded DNA. MLH1-MLH3 binds specifically to Holliday junctions and may act as part of a larger complex to process Holliday junctions during meiosis. MLH1-MLH3 heterodimer (MutL gamma) together with Exo1 and Sgs1 (ortholog of Bloom syndrome helicase) define a joint molecule resolution pathway that produces the majority of crossovers in budding yeast and, by inference, in mammals.

== Interactions ==
MLH3 has been shown to interact with MSH4.
