= Endonuclease V =

ENDOV

Identifiers
- Aliases: ENDOV, endonuclease V, Endonuclease V, Endonuclease-V, IPR007581
- External IDs: MGI: 2444688; GeneCards: ENDOV
Available structures
PDB	Ortholog search: PDBe RCSB
PDB	List of PDB id codes 4NSP

Gene location (Human)
Chr.	Chromosome 17 (human)
Band	17q25.3	Start	80,415,165 bp
Band	17q25.3	End	80,438,086 bp

Gene location (Mouse)
Chr.	Chromosome 11 (mouse)
Band	11|11 E2	Start	119,382,173 bp
Band	11|11 E2	End	119,402,263 bp
RNA expression pattern
Bgee	Human / Mouse (ortholog); Top expressed in: parotid gland; right uterine tube; external globus pallidus; vena cava; right hemisphere of cerebellum; left testis; right testis; anterior pituitary; nucleus accumbens; body of uterus / Top expressed in: genital tubercle; tail of embryo; ventricular zone; granulocyte; lip; dentate gyrus of hippocampal formation granule cell; spermatocyte; lumbar subsegment of spinal cord; neural layer of retina; superior frontal gyrus; More reference expression data
BioGPS	n/a
Gene ontology
Molecular function	endodeoxyribonuclease activity, producing 5'-phosphomonoesters; endonuclease activity; metal ion binding; single-stranded RNA binding; endoribonuclease activity, producing 5'-phosphomonoesters; hydrolase activity; RNA binding; nuclease activity; magnesium ion binding; DNA binding
Cellular component	nucleus; cytoplasm; nucleolus
Biological process	nucleic acid phosphodiester bond hydrolysis; DNA repair; RNA phosphodiester bond hydrolysis, endonucleolytic
Sources:Amigo / QuickGO
Orthologs
Databases	NCBI: entry; OMA: entry
Species	Human	Mouse
Entrez	284131	338371
Ensembl	ENSG00000173818	ENSMUSG00000039850
UniProt	Q8N8Q3	Q8C9A2
RefSeq (mRNA)	NM_001164637; NM_001164638; NM_173627; NM_001352760; NM_001352761	NM_001164636; NM_177394
RefSeq (protein)	NP_001158109; NP_001158110; NP_775898; NP_001339689; NP_001339690	NP_001158108; NP_796368; NP_001388988; NP_001388989
Location (UCSC)	Chr 17: 80.42 – 80.44 Mb	Chr 11: 119.38 – 119.4 Mb
PubMed search
- Wikidata
View/Edit Human	View/Edit Mouse

Endonuclease V
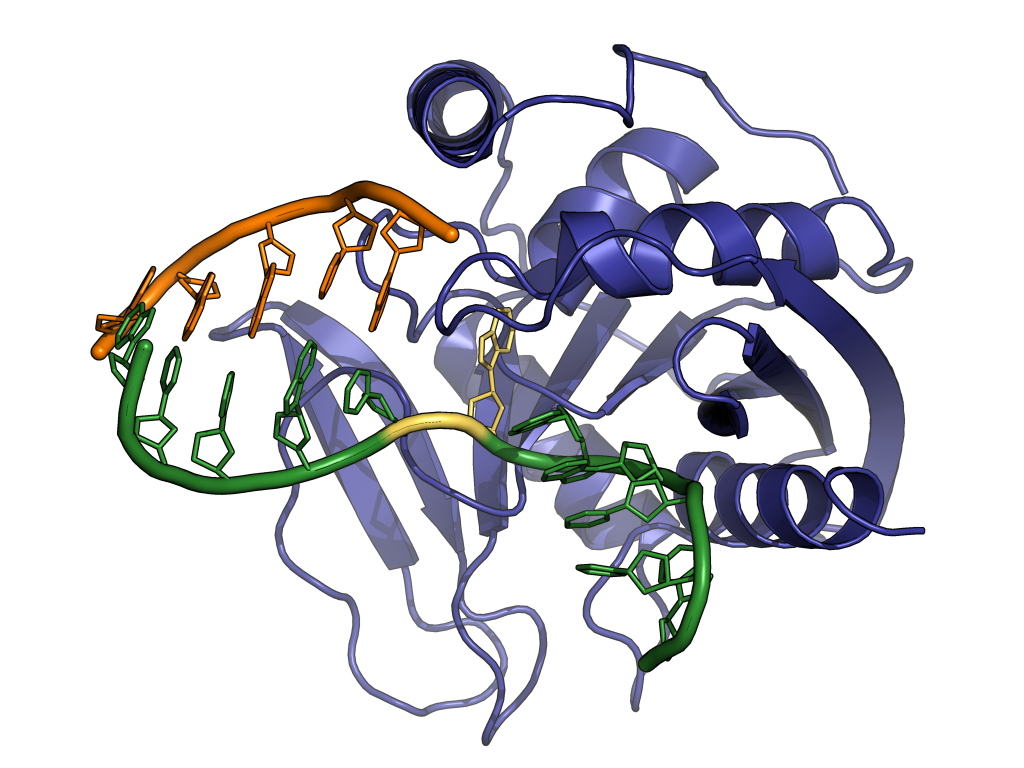
- Crystallographic structure of Thermotoga maritima endoV (blue) in complex with DNA (green and orange). The deamidated base is shown in yellow.

Identifiers
- Symbol: ENDOV
- Pfam: PF04493
- InterPro: IPR007581
Available protein structures:
- PDB: IPR007581 PF04493 (ECOD; PDBsum)
- AlphaFold: IPR007581; PF04493

Endonuclease V (endoV) is a highly conserved endonuclease enzyme family. The primary function of endoV differs significantly in prokaryotes and eukaryotes, as suggested by studies on the E. coli and human orthologs.

In prokaryotes endoV is primarily a deoxyribonuclease involved in DNA repair of deoxyinosine introduced into the genome by deamidation of adenine bases (EC 3.1.21.7). However, it has broad substrate specificity and can also act on other types of DNA lesions as well as on inosine-containing RNA.

In eukaryotes endoV is primarily a ribonuclease and cleaves single-stranded RNA at the 3' position relative to an inosine base, which may be present due to RNA editing by deaminase enzymes (EC 3.1.26.-). The human endoV localizes to the cytoplasm and nucleoli, suggesting a possible role in processes involving ribosomal RNA. The human gene symbol is ENDOV.
