= Endonuclease =

Enzymes which cleave a nucleotide chain

In molecular biology, endonucleases are enzymes that cleave the phosphodiester bond within a polynucleotide chain (namely DNA or RNA). Some, such as deoxyribonuclease I, cut DNA relatively nonspecifically (with regard to sequence), while many, typically called restriction endonucleases or restriction enzymes, cleave only at very specific nucleotide sequences. Endonucleases differ from exonucleases, which cleave the ends of recognition sequences instead of the middle (endo) portion. Some enzymes known as "exo-endonucleases", however, are not limited to either nuclease function, displaying qualities that are both endo- and exo-like. Evidence suggests that endonuclease activity experiences a lag compared to exonuclease activity.

Restriction enzymes are endonucleases from eubacteria and archaea that recognize a specific DNA sequence. The nucleotide sequence recognized for cleavage by a restriction enzyme is called the restriction site. Typically, a restriction site will be a palindromic sequence about four to six nucleotides long. Most restriction endonucleases cleave the DNA strand unevenly, leaving complementary single-stranded ends. These ends can reconnect through hybridization and are termed "sticky ends". Once paired, the phosphodiester bonds of the fragments can be joined by DNA ligase. There are hundreds of restriction endonucleases known, each attacking a different restriction site. The DNA fragments cleaved by the same endonuclease can be joined regardless of the origin of the DNA. Such DNA is called recombinant DNA; DNA formed by the joining of genes into new combinations. Restriction endonucleases (restriction enzymes) are divided into three categories, Type I, Type II, and Type III, according to their mechanism of action. These enzymes are often used in genetic engineering to make recombinant DNA for introduction into bacterial, plant, or animal cells, as well as in synthetic biology. One of the more famous endonucleases is Cas9.

== Categories ==
Ultimately, there are three categories of restriction endonucleases that relatively contribute to the cleavage of specific sequences. The types I and III are large multisubunit complexes that include both the endonucleases and methylase activities. Type I can cleave at random sites of about 1000 base pairs or more from the recognition sequence and it requires ATP as source of energy. Type II behaves slightly differently and was first isolated by Hamilton Smith in 1970. They are simpler versions of the endonucleases and require no ATP in their degradation processes. Some examples of type II restriction endonucleases include BamHI, EcoRI, EcoRV, HindIII, and HaeIII. Type III, however, cleaves the DNA at about 25 base pairs from the recognition sequence and also requires ATP in the process.

== Notations ==
The commonly used notation for restriction endonucleases is of the form "VwxyZ", where "Vwx" are, in italics, the first letter of the genus and the first two letters of the species where this restriction endonuclease may be found, for example, Escherichia coli, Eco, and Haemophilus influenzae, Hin. This is followed by the optional, non-italicized symbol "y", which indicates the type or strain identification, for example, EcoR for E. coli strains bearing the drug resistance transfer factor RTF-1, EcoB for E. coli strain B, and Hind for H. influenzae strain d. Finally, when a particular type or strain has several different restriction endonucleases, these are identified by Roman numerals, thus, the restriction endonucleases from H. influenzae strain d are named HindI, HindII, HindIII, etc. Another example: "HaeII" and "HaeIII" refer to bacterium Haemophilus aegyptius (strain not specified), restriction endonucleases number II and number III, respectively. The restriction enzymes used in molecular biology usually recognize short target sequences of about 4 – 8 base pairs. For instance, the EcoRI enzyme recognizes and cleaves the sequence 5' – GAATTC – 3'.

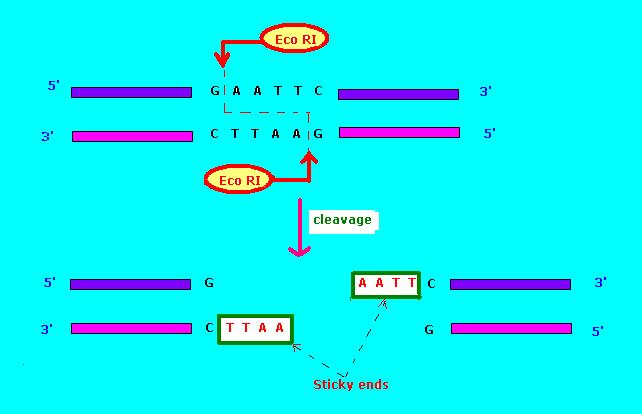
Restriction enzyme Eco RI

Restriction endonucleases come in several types. A restriction endonuclease typically requires a recognition site and a cleavage pattern (typically of nucleotide bases: A, C, G, T). If the recognition site is outside the region of the cleavage pattern, then the restriction endonuclease is referred to as Type I. If the recognition sequence overlaps with the cleavage sequence, then the restriction endonuclease restriction enzyme is Type II.

== Processes involved with endonucleases ==
Endonucleases play a role in many aspects of biological life. Below are a couple examples of processes where endonucleases play a crucial role.

=== DNA repair ===
Endonucleases play a role in DNA repair. AP endonuclease, specifically, catalyzes the incision of DNA exclusively at AP sites, and therefore prepares DNA for subsequent excision, repair synthesis and DNA ligation. For example, when depurination occurs, this lesion leaves a deoxyribose sugar with a missing base. The AP endonuclease recognizes this sugar and essentially cuts the DNA at this site and then allows for DNA repair to continue. E. coli cells contain two AP endonucleases: endonuclease IV (endoIV) and exonuclease III (exoIII) while in eukaryotes, there is only one AP endonuclease.

==== DNA crosslink repair ====
Repair of DNA in which the two complementary strands are joined by an interstrand covalent crosslink requires multiple incisions in order to disengage the strands and remove the damage. Incisions are required on both sides of the crosslink and on both strands of the duplex DNA. In mouse embryonic stem cells, an intermediate stage of crosslink repair involves production of double-strand breaks. MUS81/EME1 is a structure specific endonuclease involved in converting interstrand crosslinks to double-strand breaks in a DNA replication-dependent manner. After introduction of a double-strand break, further steps are required to complete the repair process. If a crosslink is not properly repaired it can block DNA replication.

==== Thymine dimer repair ====
Exposure of bacteriophage (phage) T4 to ultraviolet irradiation induces thymine dimers in the phage DNA. The phage T4 denV gene encodes endonuclease V that catalyzes the initial steps in the repair of these UV-induced thymine dimers. Endonuclease V first cleaves the glycosylic bond on the 5’ side of a pyrimidine dimer and then catalyzes cleavage of the DNA phosphodiester bond that originally linked the two nucleotides of the dimer. Subsequent steps in the repair process involve removal of the dimer remnants and repair synthesis to fill in the resulting single-strand gap using the undamaged strand as template.

=== Apoptosis ===
During apoptosis, Apoptotic endonuclease DFF40 is activated to initiate controlled cellular disassembly. This disintegration is characterized by the cleavage of genomic DNA into specific fragments. The precise role of endonucleases in this context is to cleave the DNA at specific sites, generating fragments with defined lengths. These fragments are then packaged into apoptotic bodies, ensuring a neat and efficient removal of the dying cell without causing inflammation or damage to neighboring cells.

=== DNA Replication ===
Flap endonuclease 1 (FEN1) and Dna2 endonuclease are integral to DNA replication on the lagging strand, participating in crucial processes such as primer removal and Okazaki fragment processing. Endonucleases are actively involved in processing these fragments by cleaving the phosphodiester bonds between them. This process is integral to the seamless synthesis and joining of Okazaki fragments, contributing to the overall continuity of the newly replicated DNA strand.

=== RNA Processing ===
Endonucleases, more specifically endoribonuclease, play a crucial role in RNA processing, a fundamental step in gene expression. This process involves the precise cleavage of precursor RNA molecules, guided by endonucleases, to generate functional RNAs essential for various cellular functions. Endonucleases selectively cleave precursor RNAs at specific sites, defining the boundaries of functional RNA segments during RNA processing. The outcome of RNA processing is the production of functional RNA molecules, such as transfer RNAs (tRNAs) and ribosomal RNAs (rRNAs). Endonucleases contribute to the precision of this process, ensuring the formation of mature and functional RNA species.

Endonucleases like RNase P and tRNase Z (ELAC2), shape precursor tRNAs into mature, functional tRNAs, crucial for accurate translation during protein synthesis. In ribosome biogenesis, endonucleases from the RNase III family, like DROSHA, play a role in processing precursor rRNAs, contributing to the assembly of functional ribosomes.

DICER and DROSHA also from the RNase III family play a role in the processing pre-miRNA to functional miRNA.

=== Maturation of Nails and Hairs ===
The endonuclease DNase1L2 also contribute prominently to the removal of DNA during the formation of hair and nails. This process is essential for the maturation of hair and nail structures and is crucial for the transformation of cells into durable and keratinized structures, ensuring the strength and integrity of hair and nails.

== Further discussion ==
Restriction endonucleases may be found that cleave standard dsDNA (double-stranded DNA), or ssDNA (single-stranded DNA), or even RNA. This discussion is restricted to dsDNA; however, the discussion can be extended to the following:

- Standard dsDNA
- Non-standard DNA
1. Holliday junctions
2. Triple-stranded DNA, quadruple-stranded DNA (G-quadruplex)
3. Double-stranded hybrids of DNA and RNA (one strand is DNA, the other strand is RNA)
4. Synthetic or artificial DNA (for example, containing bases other than A, C, G, T, refer to the work of Eric T. Kool). Research with synthetic codons, refer to the research by S. Benner, and enlarging the amino acid set in polypeptides, thus enlarging the proteome or proteomics, see the research by P. Schultz.

In addition, research is now underway to construct synthetic or artificial restriction endonucleases, especially with recognition sites that are unique within a genome.

Restriction endonucleases or restriction enzymes typically cleave in two ways: blunt-ended or sticky-ended patterns. An example of a Type I restriction endonuclease.

Furthermore, there exist DNA/RNA non-specific endonucleases, such as those that are found in Serratia marcescens, which act on dsDNA, ssDNA, and RNA.

== Common endonucleases ==
Below are tables of common prokaryotic and eukaryotic endonucleases.

Prokaryotic Enzyme	Source	Comments
RecBCD endonuclease	E. coli	Partially ATP dependent; also an exonuclease; functions in recombination and repair
T7 endonuclease (P00641)	phage T7 (gene 3)	Essential for replication; preference for single stranded over double stranded DNA
T4 endonuclease II (P07059)	phage T4 (denA)	Splits -TpC- sequence to yield 5'-dCMP- terminated oligonucleotides; chain length of product varies with conditions
Bal 31 endonuclease	P. espejiana	Also an exonuclease; nibbles away 3' and 5' ends of duplex DNA. A mixture of at least two nucleases, fast and slow.
Endonuclease I (endo I; P25736)	E. coli (endA)	Periplasmic location; average chain length of product is 7; inhibited by tRNA; produces double stranded DNA break; produces nick when complexed with tRNA; endo I mutants grow normally
Micrococcal nuclease (P00644)	Staphylococcus	Produces 3'-P termini; requires Ca2+; also acts on RNA; prefers single stranded DNA and AT-rich regions
Endonuclease II (endo VI, exo III; P09030)	E. coli (xthA)	Cleavage next to AP site; also a 3'→5' exonuclease; phosphomonoesterase on 3'-P termini
Eukaryotic Enzyme	Source	Comments
Neurospora endonuclease	Neurospora crassa, mitochondria	Also acts on RNA.
S1 nuclease (P24021)	Aspergillus oryzae	Also acts on RNA
P1-nuclease (P24289)	Penicillium citrinum	Also acts on RNA
Mung bean nuclease I	mung bean sprouts	Also acts on RNA
Ustilago nuclease (Dnase I)	Ustilago maydis	Also acts on RNA
Dnase I (P00639)	Bovine pancreas	Average chain length of product is 4; produces double strand break in presence of Mn2+
AP endonuclease	Nucleus, mitochondria	Involved in DNA Base Excision Repair pathway
Endo R	HeLa cells	Specific for GC sites
FLAP1	Nucleus	Responsible for processing Okazaki fragments during DNA replication

== Mutations ==
Xeroderma pigmentosa is a rare, autosomal recessive disease caused by a defective UV-specific endonuclease. Patients with mutations are unable to repair DNA damage caused by sunlight.

Sickle Cell anemia is a disease caused by a point mutation. The sequence altered by the mutation eliminates the recognition site for the restriction endonuclease MstII that recognizes the nucleotide sequence.

tRNA splicing endonuclease mutations cause pontocerebellar hypoplasia. Pontocerebellar hypoplasias (PCH) represent a group of neurodegenerative autosomal recessive disorders that is caused by mutations in three of the four different subunits of the tRNA-splicing endonuclease complex.

== See also ==
- Exonuclease
- Restriction endonuclease
- Nuclease
- Ribonuclease
- AP endonuclease
- HUH-tag
