= MtDNA control region =

Non-coding region of the mitochondrial DNA

Mitochondrial DNA control region secondary structure A
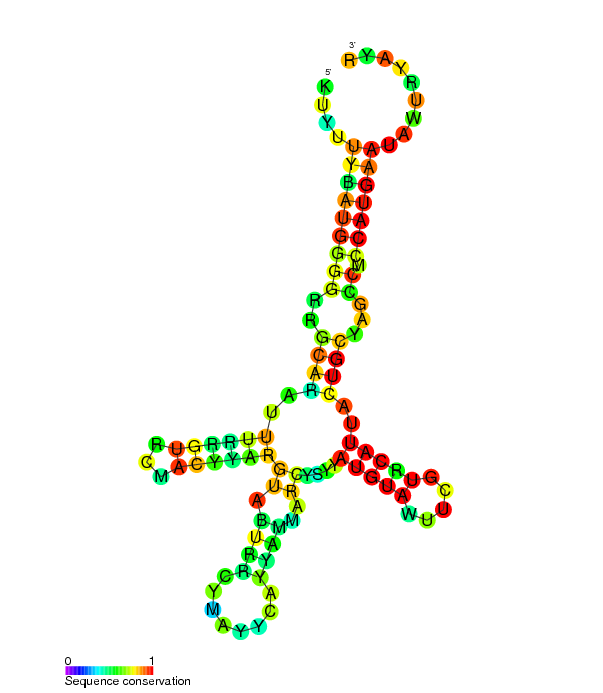
- The consensus secondary structure for all haplotypes of the mtDNA control region.

Identifiers
- Symbol: mtDNA ssA
- Rfam: RF01853

Other data
- RNA type: Antisense RNA
- Domain: Mammalia
- PDB structures: PDBe

Location of the control region (CR) in the human mitochondrial genome (grey box), with the three hypervariable regions (HV: green boxes).

A mitochondrion is a specialized organelle found in the cytoplasm of eukaryotic cells, which is the powerhouse of cells that produce energy through oxidative phosphorylation. Besides producing energy, they are crucial for various cellular functions such as calcium signaling, controlling metabolism, synthesizing hemoglobin and steroids, and regulating programmed cell death. Besides the production of ATP, there is a complex relationship between the mitochondrial genome (mtDNA) and the nuclear genome (nDNA). Unlike nuclear DNA which resides in the nucleus, mtDNA is inherited from the mother. Upon fertilization, the mtDNA of the sperm is typically lost through ubiquitination, and only the egg contributes to the mtDNA of the zygote, due to the significant difference in mtDNA copy number between the sperm (about 100 copies) and the egg (about 100,000 copies).

Mitochondrial DNA (mtDNA) is a small, abundant, and purified molecule of DNA. It is a closed, circular, double-stranded molecule of around 16.6 kb (kilobase). Mitochondrial DNA strands are identified by their nucleotide composition: the heavy strand (H-strand) encodes most mitochondrial genes including rRNAs, tRNAs, and polypeptides involved in the oxidative phosphorylation system, while the light strand (L) encodes for additional tRNAs and a single polypeptide. A crucial component of mitochondrial DNA is the mtDNA control region which is an area of the mitochondrial genome that is non-coding DNA and controls RNA and DNA synthesis. The mitochondrial DNA control region plays a significant role in regulating mitochondrial replication and transcription, influencing mitochondrial function. The mtDNA control region contains essential binding sites for factors that maintain mitochondrial DNA and include elements like conserved sequence blocks (CSBs) and termination-associated sequences (TAS). The control region also has secondary DNA structures, such as hairpins and cruciform, which may influence transcription and replication processes. Recent research has identified 13 potential secondary structures within the control region, suggesting their involvement in regulating replication, mutation rates, and overall mtDNA function.

The mtDNA control region is the most polymorphic region of the human mtDNA genome, with polymorphism concentrated in hypervariable regions. The average nucleotide diversity in these regions is 1.7%. Despite this variability, an RNA transcript ("structure A") from this region has a conserved secondary structure (pictured) which has been found to be under selective pressure. There are 12 other secondary structures (structures B through M) in the human mtDNA control region with differing amounts of conservation. The mtDNA control region contains the origin of replication of one strand, and the origin of transcription for both strands.

== Distinction from D-loop ==
The control region and mtDNA D-loop are sometimes used synonymously in the literature; specifically the control region includes the D-loop along with adjacent transcription promoter regions. For this reason, the control region is also known by the acronym DLP, standing for D-Loop and associated Promoters.

D-loop means "displacement loop" and, in the context of mtDNA, specifically refers to a third strand that occurs as a copy of the heavy chain inside the NCR. Replication of mtDNA starts inside the D-loop. The single displaced strand is also called 7S DNA. The primer used for 7S DNA synthesis is called 7S RNA. Within this control region lies the displacement loop, or D-loop, characterized by the incorporation of a third short DNA strand known as the 7s DNA. This triplex structure paces a crucial role in the regulation of mtDNA replication and transcription process.

== Endurance study ==
mtDNA control region haplotypes have been linked with endurance capacity in human subjects. A 2002 study sequenced the control region of 55 subjects and compared their haplotype with the increase in VO_{2} max after an eight-week training program. An increase in VO2 max suggests that the subjects' bodies were more efficient at using oxygen compared to before. Therefore, they found that different haplotypes were significantly linked with the subjects' endurance. It was speculated that this was because the control region affects replication and transcription in the mitochondria.

For instance, a study involving Polish athletes found that haplogroup H and the HV cluster were significantly associated with elite endurance performance at the Olympics and World Championship levels. Similarly, research on Japanese athletes revealed association between certain mtDNA haplogroups and athletic status, suggesting a genetic predisposition influenced by mitochondrial variations.

== Relevance In Medicine ==
Mutations within the mtDNA control region have been shown to be associated with a variety of human diseases and other health applications. For example, studies have shown that areas within the mtDNA control region can exhibit a high frequency of mutations in human tumors. Furthermore, mtDNA control region mutations are commonly seen in cases of Alzheimer's disease. For example, a 2004 study found that patients with Alzheimer's disease averaged a 63% increase of mtDNA control region mutations in their brain, compared to subjects without Alzheimer's disease. In addition, this same study found that mutations in the control region of mtDNA have been linked with aging as well.

== See also ==
- D-loop
- Hypervariable region
