= MSH4 =

Protein-coding gene in humans

Identifiers
- Aliases: MSH4, mutS homolog 4
- External IDs: OMIM: 602105; MGI: 1860077; GeneCards: MSH4

Gene location (Human)
Chr.	Chromosome 1 (human)
Band	1p31.1	Start	75,796,882 bp
Band	1p31.1	End	75,913,242 bp

Gene location (Mouse)
Chr.	Chromosome 3 (mouse)
Band	3|3 H3	Start	153,562,786 bp
Band	3|3 H3	End	153,611,775 bp
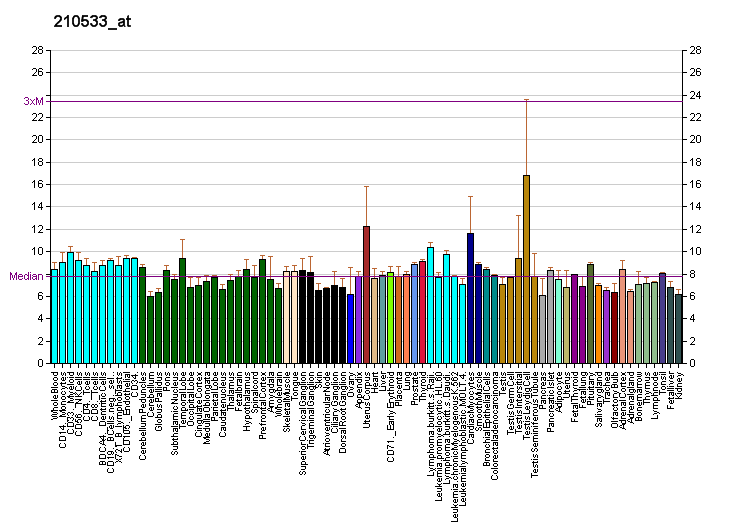
RNA expression pattern
Bgee	Human / Mouse (ortholog); Top expressed in: testicle; gonad; right coronary artery; gastrocnemius muscle; right testis; cerebellar hemisphere; right hemisphere of cerebellum; left testis; muscle of thigh; popliteal artery / Top expressed in: secondary oocyte; zygote; primary oocyte; spermatid; spermatocyte; seminiferous tubule; morula; blastocyst; ovary; thymus; More reference expression data
BioGPS	More reference expression data
Gene ontology
Molecular function	DNA binding; nucleotide binding; protein binding; ATP binding; damaged DNA binding; ATP-dependent activity, acting on DNA; mismatched DNA binding; guanine/thymine mispair binding; single thymine insertion binding
Cellular component	condensed chromosome; nucleus; condensed nuclear chromosome; recombination nodule; synaptonemal complex; mismatch repair complex; nuclear chromosome
Biological process	ovarian follicle development; reciprocal meiotic recombination; homologous chromosome pairing at meiosis; female gamete generation; meiosis; spermatogenesis; DNA mismatch repair; chiasma assembly; resolution of meiotic recombination intermediates; homologous chromosome segregation
Sources:Amigo / QuickGO
Orthologs
Databases	NCBI: entry; OMA: entry
Species	Human	Mouse
Entrez	4438	55993
Ensembl	ENSG00000057468	ENSMUSG00000005493
UniProt	O15457	Q99MT2
RefSeq (mRNA)	NM_002440	NM_001282054; NM_031870
RefSeq (protein)	NP_002431	NP_001268983; NP_114076
Location (UCSC)	Chr 1: 75.8 – 75.91 Mb	Chr 3: 153.56 – 153.61 Mb
PubMed search
- Wikidata
View/Edit Human	View/Edit Mouse

MutS protein homolog 4 is a protein that in humans is encoded by the MSH4 gene.

== Function ==
The MSH4 and MSH5 proteins form a hetero-oligomeric structure (heterodimer) in yeast and humans. In the yeast Saccharomyces cerevisiae MSH4 and MSH5 act specifically to facilitate crossovers between homologous chromosomes during meiosis. The MSH4/MSH5 complex binds and stabilizes double Holliday junctions and promotes their resolution into crossover products. An MSH4 hypomorphic (partially functional) mutant of S. cerevisiae showed a 30% genome wide reduction in crossover numbers, and a large number of meioses with non exchange chromosomes. Nevertheless this mutant gave rise to spore viability patterns suggesting that segregation of non-exchange chromosomes occurred efficiently. Thus, in S. cerevisiae, proper segregation apparently does not entirely depend on crossovers between homologous pairs.

The him-14 gene of the worm Caenorhabditis elegans encodes an ortholog of MSH4. Formation of crossovers during C. elegans meiosis requires the him-14(MSH4) gene. Loss of him-14(MSH-4) function severely reduces crossing over, resulting in lack of chiasmata between homologs and consequent missegregation. Thus, in C. elegans, segregation apparently does depend on crossovers between homologous pairs. Him-14(MSH4) functions during the pachytene stage of meiosis, indicating that it is not needed for establishing the preceding stages of pairing and synapsis of homologous chromosomes.

In an MSH4 mutant of rice, chiasma frequency was dramatically decreased to about 10% of the wild-type frequency, although the synaptonemal complex was normally installed. It is likely that MSH4 interacts with MSH5 to promote the majority of crossovers during rice meiosis.

In general it appears that MSH4 acts during meiosis to direct the recombinational repair of some DNA double-strand breaks towards the crossover option rather than the non-cross over option (see Homologous recombination).

== Interactions ==
MSH4 has been shown to interact with MLH1, MSH5 and MLH3.
