= MUS81 =

Protein-coding gene in the species Homo sapiens

Available structures
PDB	Ortholog search: PDBe RCSB
PDB	List of PDB id codes 2MC3, 4P0P, 4P0Q, 4P0R, 4P0S

Identifiers
- Aliases: MUS81, SLX3, MUS81 structure-specific endonuclease subunit
- External IDs: OMIM: 606591; MGI: 1918961; HomoloGene: 5725; GeneCards: MUS81; OMA:MUS81 - orthologs

Gene location (Human)
Chr.	Chromosome 11 (human)
Band	11q13.1	Start	65,857,126 bp
Band	11q13.1	End	65,867,653 bp

Gene location (Mouse)
Chr.	Chromosome 19 (mouse)
Band	19|19 A	Start	5,532,373 bp
Band	19|19 A	End	5,538,430 bp
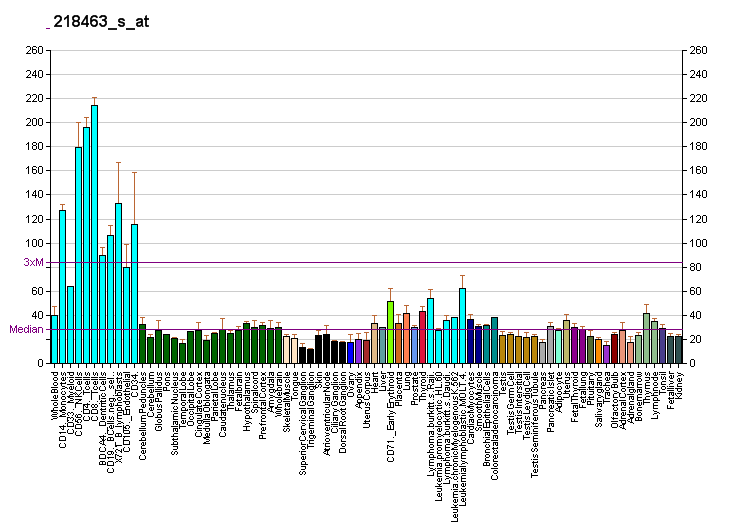
RNA expression pattern
Bgee	Human / Mouse (ortholog); Top expressed in: body of uterus; left uterine tube; muscle layer of sigmoid colon; granulocyte; mucosa of transverse colon; right ovary; canal of the cervix; right coronary artery; apex of heart; left coronary artery / Top expressed in: muscle of thigh; primary oocyte; cerebellar cortex; otic vesicle; spermatocyte; saccule; granulocyte; thymus; superior frontal gyrus; ventricular zone; More reference expression data
BioGPS	More reference expression data
Gene ontology
Molecular function	DNA binding; nuclease activity; endonuclease activity; protein binding; 3'-flap endonuclease activity; metal ion binding; hydrolase activity; endodeoxyribonuclease activity; crossover junction endodeoxyribonuclease activity
Cellular component	nucleoplasm; nucleus; nucleolus; Holliday junction resolvase complex
Biological process	DNA recombination; interstrand cross-link repair; DNA catabolic process, endonucleolytic; cellular response to DNA damage stimulus; response to intra-S DNA damage checkpoint signaling; DNA repair; resolution of meiotic recombination intermediates; double-strand break repair via break-induced replication; mitotic G2 DNA damage checkpoint signaling; replication fork processing; mitotic intra-S DNA damage checkpoint signaling; DNA metabolic process; nucleic acid phosphodiester bond hydrolysis
Sources:Amigo / QuickGO
Orthologs
Species	Human	Mouse
Entrez	80198	71711
Ensembl	ENSG00000172732	ENSMUSG00000024906
UniProt	Q96NY9	Q91ZJ0
RefSeq (mRNA)	NM_025128; NM_001350283	NM_027877
RefSeq (protein)	NP_079404; NP_001337212	NP_082153
Location (UCSC)	Chr 11: 65.86 – 65.87 Mb	Chr 19: 5.53 – 5.54 Mb
PubMed search
- Wikidata
View/Edit Human	View/Edit Mouse

Crossover junction endonuclease MUS81 is an enzyme that in humans is encoded by the MUS81 gene.

In mammalian somatic cells, MUS81 and another structure specific DNA endonuclease, XPF (ERCC4), play overlapping and essential roles in completion of homologous recombination. The significant overlap in function between these enzymes is most likely related to processing joint molecules such as D-loops and nicked Holliday junctions.

== Meiosis ==
MUS81 is a component of a minor chromosomal crossover (CO) pathway in the meiosis of budding yeast, plants and vertebrates. However, in the protozoan Tetrahymena thermophila, MUS81 appears to be part of an essential (if not the predominant) CO pathway. The MUS81 pathway also appears to be the predominant CO pathway in the fission yeast Schizosaccharomyces pombe.

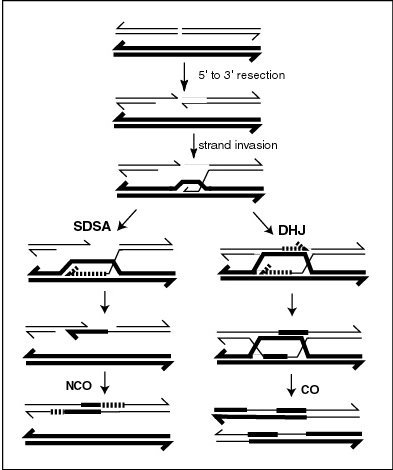
A current model of meiotic recombination, initiated by a double-strand break or gap, followed by pairing with an homologous chromosome and strand invasion to initiate the recombinational repair process. Repair of the gap can lead to crossover (CO) or non-crossover (NCO) of the flanking regions. CO recombination is thought to occur by the Double Holliday Junction (DHJ) model, illustrated on the right, above. NCO recombinants are thought to occur primarily by the Synthesis Dependent Strand Annealing (SDSA) model, illustrated on the left, above. Most recombination events appear to be the SDSA type.

The relationship of the CO pathway to the overall process of meiotic recombination is illustrated in the accompanying diagram. Recombination during meiosis is often initiated by a DNA double-strand break (DSB). During recombination, sections of DNA at the 5' ends of the break are cut away in a process called resection. In the strand invasion step that follows, an overhanging 3' end of the broken DNA molecule "invades" the DNA of an homologous chromosome that is not broken forming a displacement loop (D-loop). After strand invasion, the further sequence of events may follow either of two main pathways, leading to a crossover (CO) or a non-crossover (NCO) recombinant (see Genetic recombination). The pathway leading to a CO involves a double Holliday junction (DHJ) intermediate. Holliday junctions need to be resolved for CO recombination to be completed.

MUS81-MMS4, in the budding yeast Saccharomyces cerevisiae, is a DNA structure-selective endonuclease that cleaves joint DNA molecules formed during homologous recombination in meiosis and mitosis. The MUS81-MMS4 endonuclease, although a minor resolvase for CO formation in S. cerevisiae, is crucial for limiting chromosome entanglements by suppressing multiple consecutive recombination events from initiating from the same DSB.

Mus81 deficient mice have significant meiotic defects including the failure to repair a subset of DSBs.

== Interactions ==
MUS81 has been shown to interact with CHEK2.
