= GEN1, Holliday junction 5' flap endonuclease =

Protein-coding gene in the species Homo sapiens

GEN1

Identifiers
- Aliases: GEN1, Gen, Holliday junction 5' flap endonuclease, GEN1 Holliday junction 5' flap endonuclease
- External IDs: OMIM: 612449; MGI: 2443149; GeneCards: GEN1

Gene location (Human)
Chr.	Chromosome 2 (human)
Band	2p24.2	Start	17,753,858 bp
Band	2p24.2	End	17,788,946 bp

Gene location (Mouse)
Chr.	Chromosome 12 (mouse)
Band	12|12 A1.1	Start	11,288,921 bp
Band	12|12 A1.1	End	11,315,802 bp
RNA expression pattern
Bgee	Human / Mouse (ortholog); Top expressed in: testicle; bone marrow cell; gonad; endothelial cell; epithelium of nasopharynx; ventricular zone; pancreatic ductal cell; tonsil; appendix; rectum / Top expressed in: tail of embryo; genital tubercle; zygote; lumbar spinal ganglion; yolk sac; secondary oocyte; maxillary prominence; embryo; ventricular zone; epiblast; More reference expression data
BioGPS	n/a
Gene ontology
Molecular function	crossover junction endodeoxyribonuclease activity; DNA binding; nuclease activity; endonuclease activity; catalytic activity; hydrolase activity; metal ion binding; endodeoxyribonuclease activity; magnesium ion binding; four-way junction DNA binding; 5'-flap endonuclease activity; protein homodimerization activity; double-stranded DNA binding; single-stranded DNA binding; single-stranded DNA 3'-5' exodeoxyribonuclease activity; double-stranded DNA 3'-5' exodeoxyribonuclease activity; single-stranded DNA 5'-3' exodeoxyribonuclease activity; flap endonuclease activity; double-stranded DNA 5'-3' exodeoxyribonuclease activity; 5'-3' exodeoxyribonuclease activity
Cellular component	centrosome; nucleus; nucleoplasm
Biological process	resolution of recombination intermediates; positive regulation of mitotic cell cycle spindle assembly checkpoint; regulation of centrosome duplication; resolution of mitotic recombination intermediates; nucleic acid phosphodiester bond hydrolysis; cellular response to DNA damage stimulus; DNA repair; double-strand break repair via homologous recombination; replication fork processing; DNA catabolic process, endonucleolytic; DNA catabolic process, exonucleolytic; UV-damage excision repair
Sources:Amigo / QuickGO
Orthologs
Databases	NCBI: entry; OMA: entry
Species	Human	Mouse
Entrez	348654	209334
Ensembl	ENSG00000178295	ENSMUSG00000051235
UniProt	Q17RS7	Q8BMI4
RefSeq (mRNA)	NM_001130009; NM_182625	NM_177331
RefSeq (protein)	NP_001123481; NP_872431	NP_796305
Location (UCSC)	Chr 2: 17.75 – 17.79 Mb	Chr 12: 11.29 – 11.32 Mb
PubMed search
- Wikidata
View/Edit Human	View/Edit Mouse

GEN1, Holliday junction 5' flap endonuclease is a protein that in humans is encoded by the GEN1 gene.

== Function ==
This gene encodes a member of the Rad2/xeroderma pigmentosum group G nuclease family, whose members are characterized by N-terminal and internal xeroderma pigmentosum group G nuclease domains followed by helix-hairpin-helix domains and disordered C-terminal domains. The protein encoded by this gene is involved in resolution of Holliday junctions, which are intermediate four-way structures that covalently link DNA during homologous recombination and double-strand break repair. The protein resolves Holliday junctions by creating dual incisions across the junction to produce nicked duplex products that can be ligated. In addition, this protein has been found to localize to centrosomes where it has been implicated in regulation of centrosome integrity. Alternative splicing results in multiple transcript variants. [provided by RefSeq, Jul 2016].

=== Redundancy with EME1/MUS81 ===
The GEN1 endonuclease shares redundancy with the EME1/MUS81 protein complex for DNA damage repair in mammalian cells. GEN1 and EME1/MUS81, in mice, have redundant functions with respect to their contributions to Holliday junction processing. When mice had homozygous mutations for both Gen1 and Eme1, they exhibited synthetic lethality at an early embryonic stage. Gen1 mutant homozygosity, alone, in mice did not cause a DNA repair deficiency. However, if mice homozygous for mutant Gen1 were also heterozyous for an Emc1 mutation, they displayed elevated sensitivity to DNA damaging agents. These observations indicated that GEN1 and EME1 have redundant roles in DNA repair. Gen1 and Emc1 also appear to have redundant roles in meiotic recombination.
