= MSH5 =

Protein found in humans

Identifiers
- Aliases: MSH5, G7, MUTSH5, NG23, mutS homolog 5, POF13
- External IDs: OMIM: 603382; MGI: 1329021; GeneCards: MSH5

Gene location (Human)
Chr.	Chromosome 6 (human)
Band	6p21.33	Start	31,739,677 bp
Band	6p21.33	End	31,762,676 bp

Gene location (Mouse)
Chr.	Chromosome 17 (mouse)
Band	17 B1|17 18.57 cM	Start	35,028,605 bp
Band	17 B1|17 18.57 cM	End	35,046,745 bp
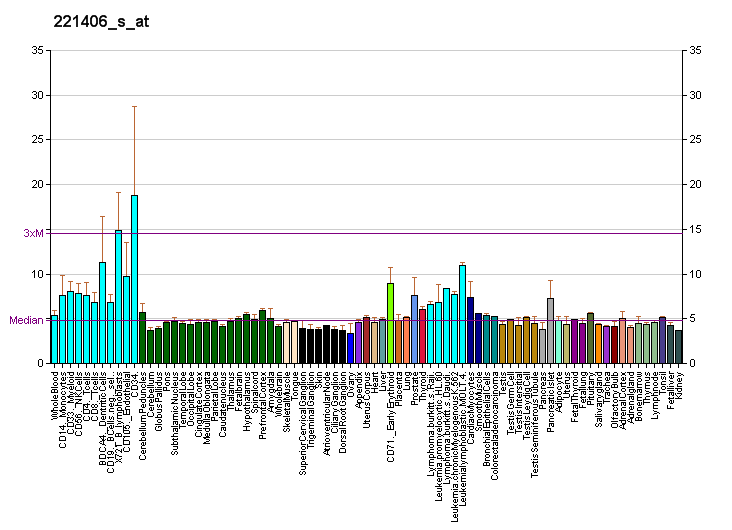

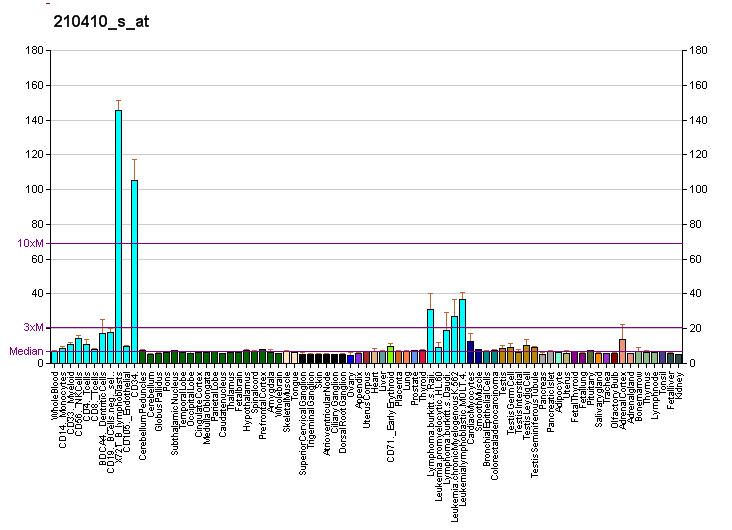

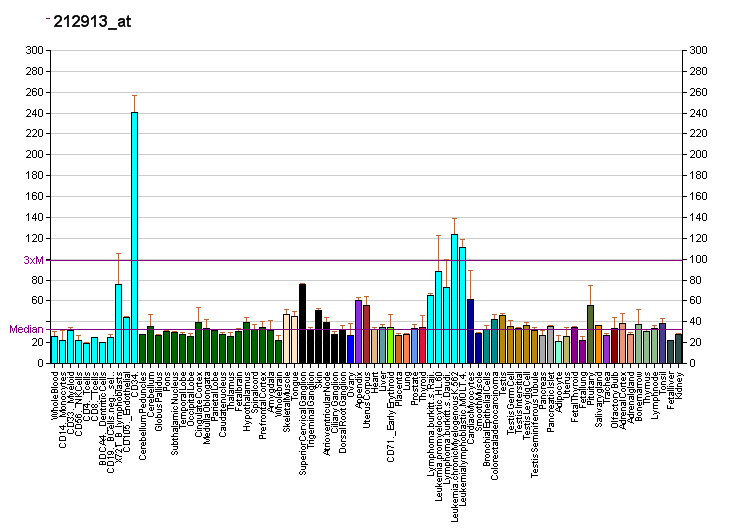
RNA expression pattern
Bgee	Human / Mouse (ortholog); Top expressed in: right uterine tube; right testis; left testis; bone marrow; ventricular zone; sural nerve; bone marrow cell; prostate; spleen; granulocyte / Top expressed in: spermatocyte; spermatid; embryo; embryo; granulocyte; yolk sac; tail of embryo; thymus; genital tubercle; ventricular zone; More reference expression data
BioGPS	More reference expression data
Gene ontology
Molecular function	nucleotide binding; DNA binding; protein binding; ATP binding; damaged DNA binding; ATP-dependent activity, acting on DNA; mismatched DNA binding; guanine/thymine mispair binding; single thymine insertion binding
Cellular component	synaptonemal complex; mismatch repair complex
Biological process	meiosis; DNA repair; cellular response to DNA damage stimulus; DNA mismatch repair; chiasma assembly; resolution of meiotic recombination intermediates; reciprocal meiotic recombination; homologous chromosome segregation
Sources:Amigo / QuickGO
Orthologs
Databases	NCBI: entry; OMA: entry
Species	Human	Mouse
Entrez	4439	17687
Ensembl	ENSG00000230961; ENSG00000235569; ENSG00000204410; ENSG00000230293; ENSG00000235222 ENSG00000237333; ENSG00000227314; ENSG00000233345	ENSMUSG00000007035
UniProt	O43196; Q5SSR2	Q9QUM7
RefSeq (mRNA)	NM_172166; NM_002441; NM_025259; NM_172165	NM_001146215; NM_013600
RefSeq (protein)	NP_002432; NP_079535; NP_751897; NP_751898; NP_751897.1	NP_001139687; NP_038628
Location (UCSC)	Chr 6: 31.74 – 31.76 Mb	Chr 17: 35.03 – 35.05 Mb
PubMed search
- Wikidata
View/Edit Human	View/Edit Mouse

MutS protein homolog 5 is a protein that in humans is encoded by the MSH5 gene.

== Function ==
This gene encodes a member of the mutS family of proteins that are involved in DNA mismatch repair or meiotic recombination processes. This protein is similar to a Saccharomyces cerevisiae protein that participates in meiotic segregation fidelity and crossing-over. This protein forms heterooligomers with another member of this family, mutS homolog 4. Alternative splicing results in four transcript variants encoding three different isoforms.

== Mutations ==
Mice homozygous for a null Msh5 mutation (Msh5-/-) are viable but sterile. In these mice, the prophase I stage of meiosis is defective due to the disruption of chromosome pairing. This meiotic failure leads, in male mice, to diminution of testicular size, and in female mice, to a complete loss of ovarian structures.

A genetic investigation was performed to test women with premature ovarian failure for mutations in each of four meiotic genes. Among 41 women with premature ovarian failure two were found to be heterozygous for a mutation in the MSH5 gene; among 34 fertile women (controls) no mutations were found in the four tested genes.

These findings in mouse and human indicate that the MSH5 protein plays an important role in meiotic recombination.

In the worm Caenorhabditis elegans, the MSH5 protein is required during meiosis both for normal spontaneous and for gamma-irradiation induced crossover recombination and chiasma formation. Meiotic recombination is often initiated by double strand breaks. MSH5 mutants retain the competence to repair DNA double-strand breaks that are present during meiosis, but they accomplish this repair in a way that does not lead to crossovers between homologous chromosomes. The known mechanism of non-crossover recombinational repair is called synthesis dependent strand annealing (see homologous recombination). MSH5 thus appears to be employed in directing the recombinational repair of some double-strand breaks towards the cross over option rather than the non-cross over option.

== Interactions ==
MSH5 has been shown to interact with MSH4.
