= Deoxyribonuclease V =

Identifiers
- EC no.: 3.1.21.7
- CAS no.: 61970-03-4

Databases
- IntEnz: IntEnz view
- BRENDA: BRENDA entry
- ExPASy: NiceZyme view
- KEGG: KEGG entry
- MetaCyc: metabolic pathway
- PRIAM: profile
- PDB structures: RCSB PDB PDBe PDBsum
Search
- PMC: articles
- PubMed: articles
- NCBI: proteins

Deoxyribonuclease V (EC 3.1.21.7, endodeoxyribonuclease V, DNase V, Escherichia coli endodeoxyribonuclease V) is an enzyme. This enzyme catalyses the following chemical reaction

Endonucleolytic cleavage at apurinic or apyrimidinic sites to products with a 5'-phosphate

== See also ==
- Deoxyribonuclease
