= D-loop =

DNA structure

In molecular biology, a displacement loop or D-loop is a DNA structure where the two strands of a double-stranded DNA molecule are separated for a stretch and held apart by a third strand of DNA. An R-loop is similar to a D-loop, but in that case the third strand is RNA rather than DNA. The third strand has a base sequence which is complementary to one of the main strands and pairs with it, thus displacing the other complementary main strand in the region. Within that region the structure is thus a form of triple-stranded DNA. A diagram in the paper introducing the term illustrated the D-loop with a shape resembling a capital "D", where the displaced strand formed the loop of the "D".

D-loops occur in a number of particular situations, including in DNA repair, in telomeres, and as a semi-stable structure in mitochondrial circular DNA molecules.

== In mitochondria ==
Researchers at Caltech discovered in 1971 that the circular mitochondrial DNA from growing cells included a short segment of three strands which they called a displacement loop. They found the third strand was a replicated segment of the heavy strand (or H-strand) of the molecule, which it displaced, and was hydrogen bonded to the light strand (or L-strand). Since then, it has been shown that the third strand is the initial segment generated by a replication of the heavy strand that has been arrested shortly after initiation and is often maintained for some period in that state. The D-loop occurs in the main non-coding area of the mitochondrial DNA molecule, a segment called the control region or D-loop region.

Replication of the mitochondrial DNA can occur in two different ways, both starting in the D-loop region. One way continues replication of the heavy strand through a substantial part (e.g. two-thirds) of the circular molecule, and then replication of the light strand begins. The more recently reported mode starts at a different origin within the D-loop region and uses coupled-strand replication with simultaneous synthesis of both strands.

Certain bases within the D-loop region are conserved, but large parts are highly variable and the region has proven to be useful for the study of the evolutionary history of vertebrates. The region contains promoters for the transcription of RNA from the two strands of mitochondrial DNA immediately adjacent to the D-loop structure that is associated with initiation of DNA replication. D-loop sequences are also of interest in the study of cancers.

The function of the D-loop is not yet clear, but recent research suggests that it participates in the organization of the mitochondrial nucleoid.

The single third strand is also called 7S DNA. The primer used for 7S DNA synthesis is called 7S RNA.

== In telomeres ==
In 1999 it was reported that telomeres, which cap the end of chromosomes, terminate in a lariat-like structure termed a T-loop (Telomere-loop). This is a loop of both strands of the chromosome which are joined to an earlier point in the double-stranded DNA by the 3' strand end invading the strand pair to form a D-loop. The joint is stabilized by the shelterin protein POT1. The T-loop, which is completed by the D-loop splice, protects the end of the chromosome from damage.

== In DNA repair ==
When a double-stranded DNA molecule has suffered a break in both strands, one repair mechanism available in diploid eukaryotic cells is homologous recombination repair. This makes use of the intact chromosome homologous to the broken one as a template to bring the two double-stranded pieces into correct alignment for rejoining. Early in this process, one strand of one piece is matched to a strand of the intact chromosome and that strand is used to form a D-loop at that point, displacing the intact chromosome's other strand. Various ligation and synthesis steps follow to effect the rejoining.

In humans, the protein RAD51 is central to the homologous search and formation of the D-loop. In the bacterium Escherichia coli, a similar function is performed by the protein RecA.

=== Meiotic recombination ===
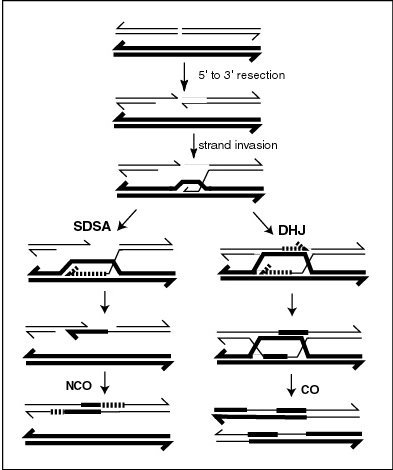
A current model of meiotic recombination, initiated by a double-strand break or gap, followed by pairing with an homologous chromosome and strand invasion to initiate the recombinational repair process. Repair of the gap can lead to crossover (CO) or non-crossover (NCO) of the flanking regions. CO recombination is thought to occur by the Double Holliday Junction (DHJ) model, illustrated on the right, above. NCO recombinants are thought to occur primarily by the Synthesis Dependent Strand Annealing (SDSA) model, illustrated on the left, above. Most recombination events appear to be the SDSA type.

During meiosis, repair of double-strand damages, particularly double-strand breaks, occurs by the recombination process outlined in the accompanying diagram. As shown in the diagram, a D-loop plays a central role in meiotic recombinational repair of such damages. During this process, Rad51 and Dmc1 recombinases bind the 3' single-strand DNA (ssDNA) tails to form helical nucleoprotein filaments that perform a search for intact homologous double-stranded DNA (dsDNA). Once the homologous sequence is found, the recombinases facilitate invasion of the ssDNA end into the homologous dsDNA to form a D-loop. After strand exchange, homologous recombination intermediates are processed by either of two distinct pathways (see diagram) to form the final recombinant chromosomes.

== See also ==
- D-loop replication
- mtDNA control region
