= Heavy strand =

Component of circular DNA molecules

Circular molecules of DNA, such as plasmids and typical mitochondrial genomes, consist of two strands of DNA called the heavy strand (or H-strand) and the light strand (or L-strand). The two strands have different masses due to different proportions of heavier nucleotides. While this difference is not known to have any functional significance, it can be used in the laboratory to segregate the strands of denatured DNA, and hence to analyze the strands separately.

Adenine and guanine (purines) are heavier than cytosine and thymine (pyrimidines) due to their extra ring. Because a purine always pairs with a pyrimidine, any excess of purines in one strand will occur with a corresponding excess of pyrimidines in the other strand and vice versa. Statistically, there is more likely to be such an imbalance than an exact 50/50 ratio. In addition, bias may arise due to differentials in the amount of protein-coding sequence on each strand, as codons do not all occur with equal frequency.
