= Nevus depigmentosus =

- Other names: Nevus achromicus
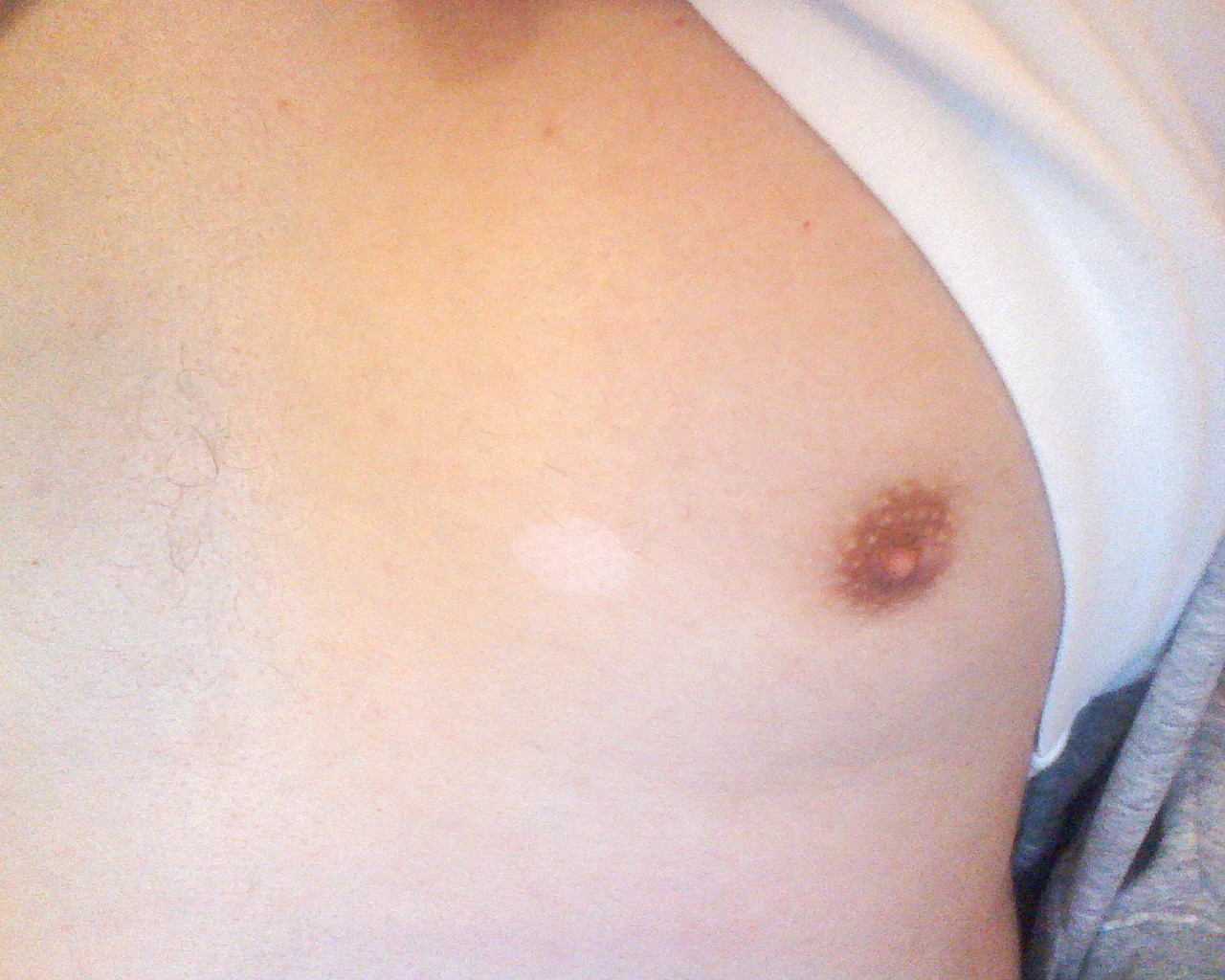
- Man's chest with nevus depigmentosus
- Specialty: Dermatology
- Symptoms: Skin hypopigmentation
- Differential diagnosis: Vitiligo

Nevus depigmentosus is a congenital disorder characterised by localised loss of skin pigmentation and can be readily distinguished from vitiligo. Although age is not a major factor in its development, approximately 19% of cases are present at birth. The lesions may increase in size proportionally with the growth of the body, but their distribution remains stable, and they are non-progressive hypopigmented patches. The exact cause of nevus depigmentosus is not fully understood; however, a sporadic defect in embryonic development has been proposed as a possible etiological factor.

The condition has sometimes been described as "localised albinism", although this terminology is considered incorrect.

Individuals with nevus depigmentosus may be more susceptible to sunburn due to the reduced melanin content in the affected skin, and appropriate sun protection is therefore recommended. Sunscreen should be applied to all exposed skin, as minimising tanning of the surrounding normal skin can help reduce the contrast with the hypopigmented patches. Most individuals with nevus depigmentosus do not seek treatment for the condition. There is currently no effective method to restore pigmentation. If the lesion is of cosmetic concern, camouflage makeup may be used. In cases where the lesion is small, surgical excision may also be considered.

== Signs and symptoms ==
Nevus depigmentosus presents as localized white patches on the skin that may occur on any area of the body. These legions are typically stable over time. In most patients, the patches are not completely achromic, but rather hypopigmented, often described as having a "splashed paint" appearance. Individual lesions are permanent, and there are currently no effective therapies to restore pigmentation in the affected areas. When hair is present within a lesion, it is usually colourless or white.

== Causes ==
In nevus depigmentosus, melanocytes, melanosomes, and the process of melanogenesis are normal; however, the defect lies in the impaired transfer of melanosomes to keratinocytes.

== Diagnosis ==
An initial diagnosis is typically made based on the characteristic appearance of the hypopigmented patches and their stable distribution. The diagnosis may be confirmed with a skin biopsy, although this is not always required.

== Treatment ==
Various therapeutic modalities have been attempted to repigment the lesions of nevus depigmentosus, including psoralen plus ultraviolet A (PUVA) therapy, excimer laser treatment, and different grafting techniques. PUVA therapy has not been shown to be beneficial. Successful repigmentation has been reported in a single case following 14 sessions of excimer laser treatment.

Though repigmentation of nevus depigmentosus may be achieved through grafting techniques, the outcomes are inconsistent, and recurrence can occur. Based on the experience reported, both the quality of repigmentation and long-term pigment retention are unpredictable.

== See also ==
- Albinism
- Alphos
- Leucism
- List of cutaneous conditions
- Melanism
- Nevus
- Pityriasis alba
- Quadrichrome vitiligo
- Selective ultraviolet phototherapy
