= NSML =

NSML may refer to:

- Naisten SM-liiga, another name for Naisten Liiga, an elite women's hockey league in Finland
- Noonan syndrome with multiple lentigines, a rare autosomal dominant multisystem disease
- North Side main line, a Chicago "L" elevated branch
