= Nevus =

Mole or birthmark; visible, circumscribed, chronic skin lesion

- Other names: nevi; mole
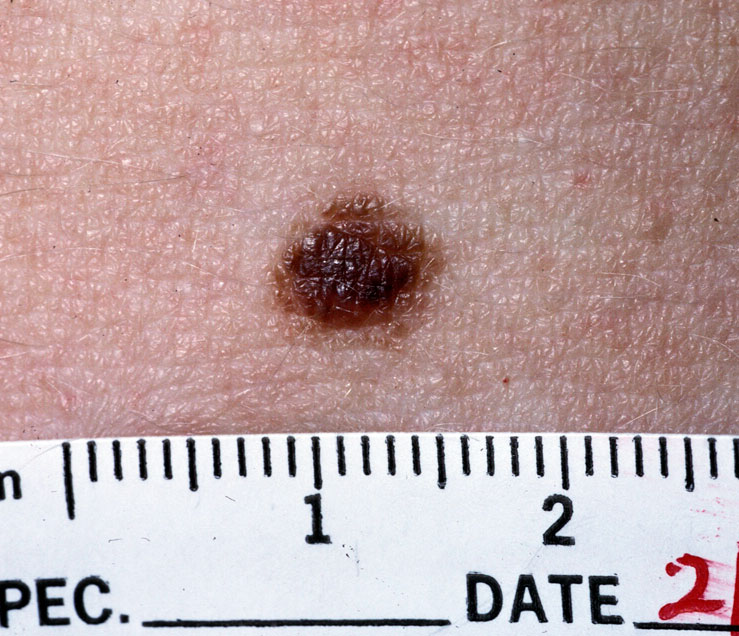
- A benign nevus
- Specialty: Dermatology

Nevus or naevus (pl. nevi or naevi) is a nonspecific medical term for a visible, circumscribed, chronic lesion of the skin or mucosa. The term originates from naevus, which is Latin for "birthmark"; however, a nevus can be either congenital (present at birth) or acquired. Common terms (mole, birthmark, beauty mark, etc.) are used to describe nevi, but these terms do not distinguish specific types of nevi from one another.

== Classification ==
The term nevus is applied to a number of conditions caused by neoplasias and hyperplasias of melanocytes, as well as a number of pigmentation disorders, both hypermelanotic (containing increased melanin, the pigment responsible for skin color) and hypomelanotic (containing decreased melanin). Suspicious skin moles which are multi-colored or pink may be a finding in skin cancer.

=== Increased melanin ===
==== Usually acquired ====
- Melanocytic nevus
  - Melanocytic nevi can be categorized based on the location of melanocytic cells
    - Junctional: epidermis
    - Intradermal: dermis
    - Compound: epidermis and dermis
- Atypical (dysplastic) nevus: This type of nevus must be diagnosed based on histological features. Clinically, atypical nevi are characterized by variable pigmentation and irregular borders.
- Becker's nevus
- Blue nevus (rarely congenital): A classic blue nevus is usually smaller than 1 cm, flat, and blue-black in color.
- Hori's nevus
- Nevus spilus (speckled lentiginous nevus): This lesion includes dark speckles within a tan-brown background.
- Pigmented spindle cell nevus
- Spitz nevus
- Zosteriform lentiginous nevus

==== Usually congenital ====
- Congenital melanocytic nevus
  - These nevi are often categorized based on size, however, the lesions usually grow in proportion to the body over time, so the category may change over an individual's life. This categorization is important because large congenital melanocytic nevi are associated with an increased risk of melanoma, a serious type of skin cancer.
    - Small: <1.5 cm
    - Medium: 1.5–19.9 cm
    - Large: ≥ 20 cm
- Nevus of Ito
- Nevus of Ota
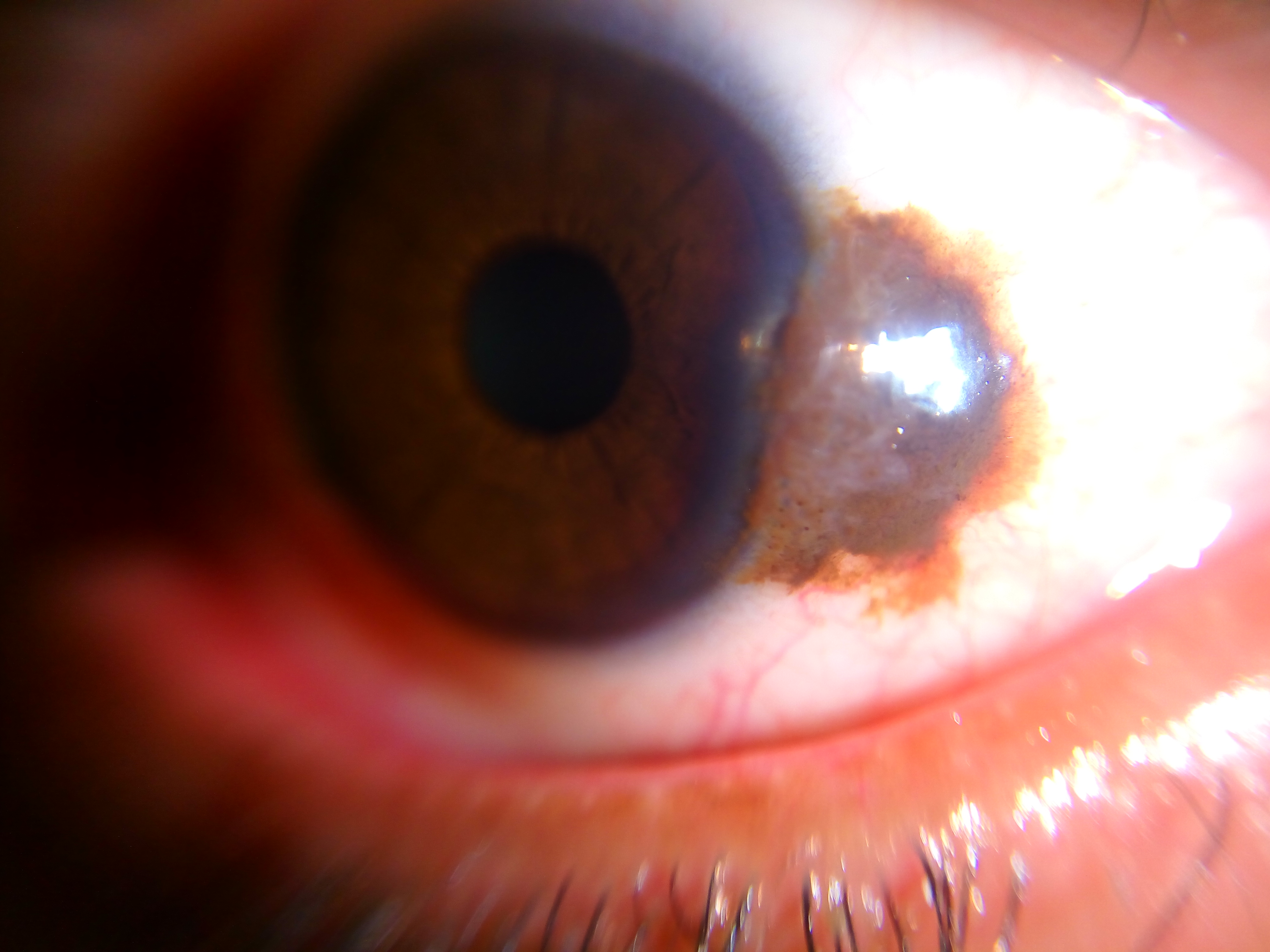
Conjunctival nevus of a 32-year-old male

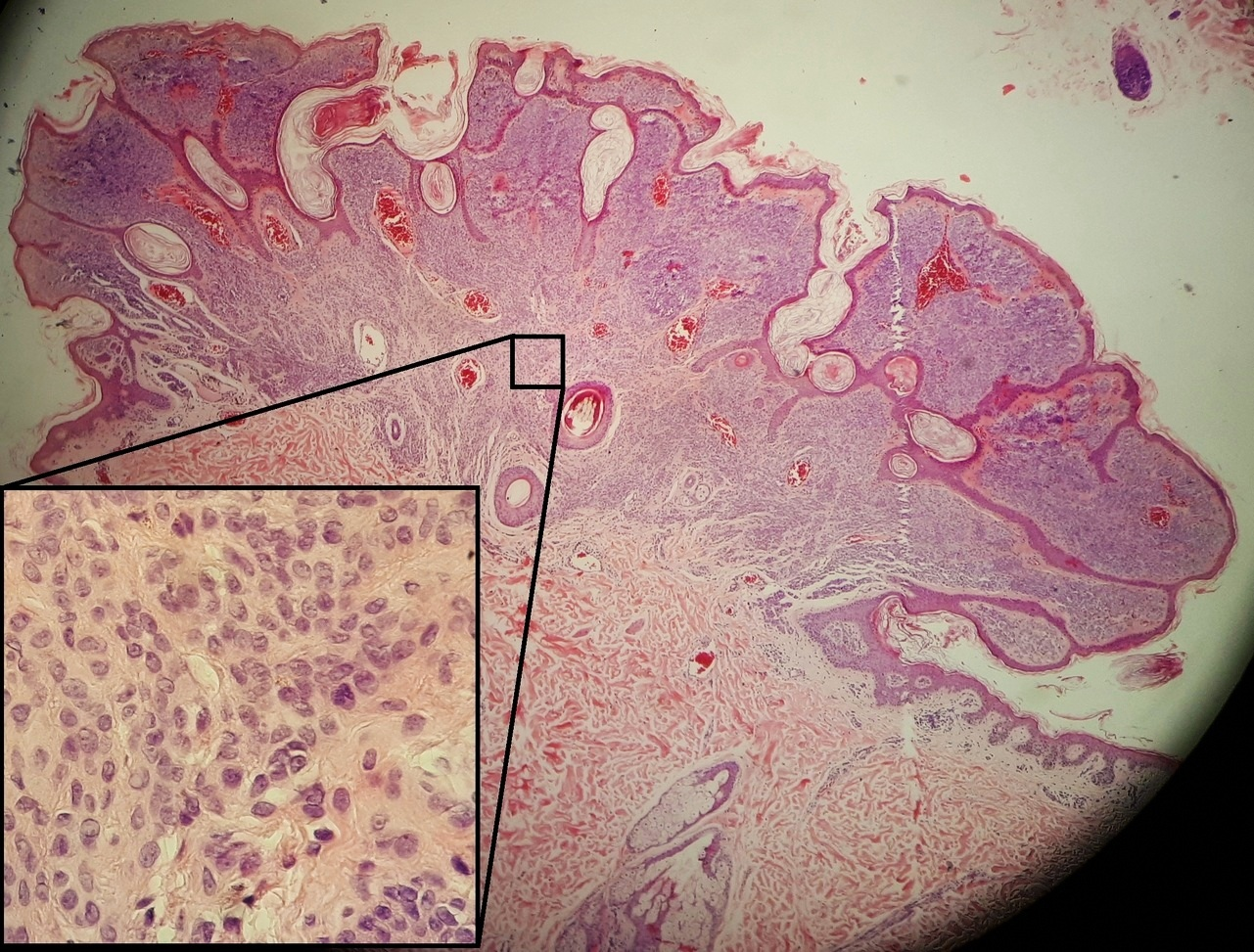
Micrograph of an intradermal melanocytic nevus

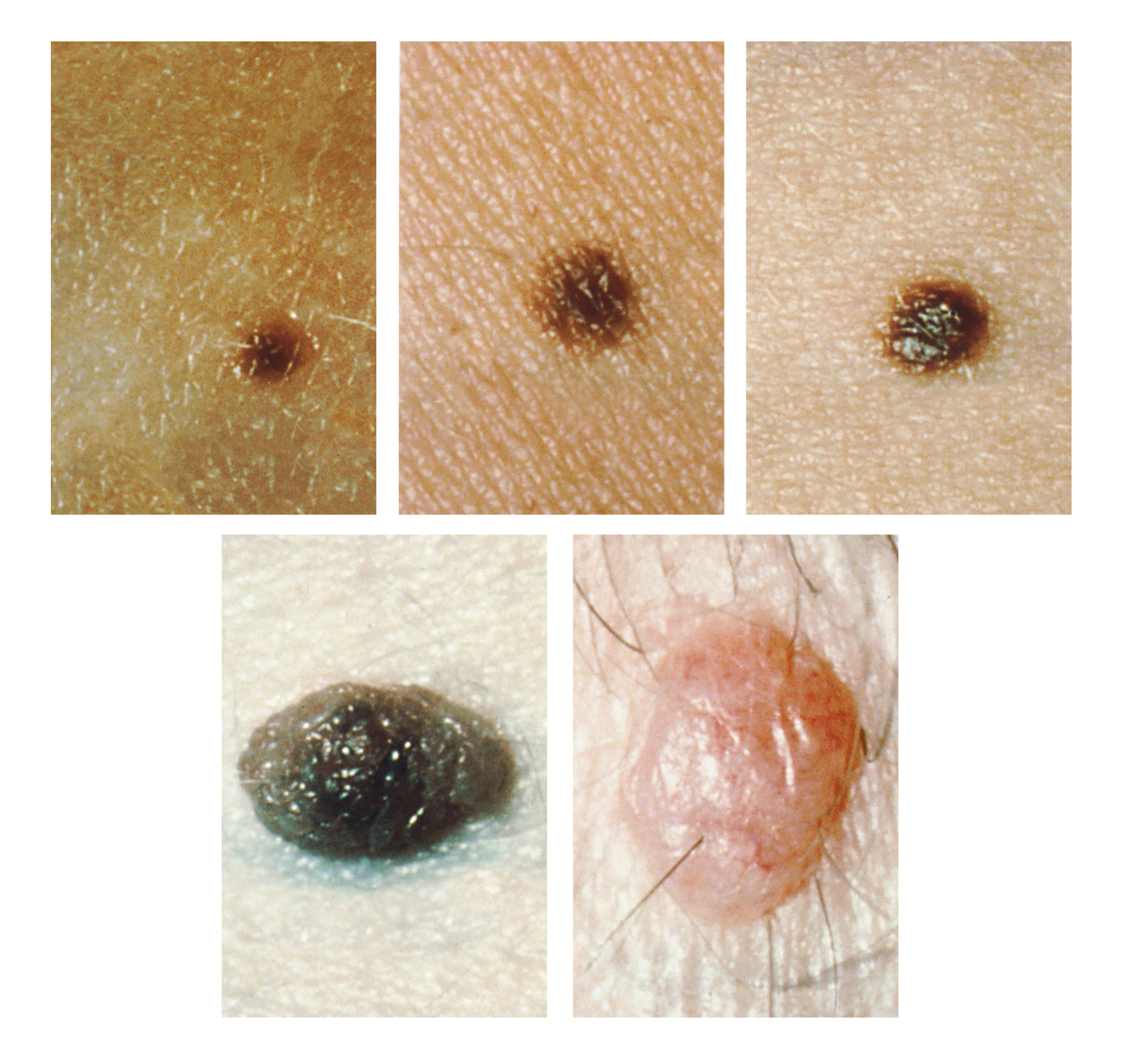
Acquired melanocytic nevi

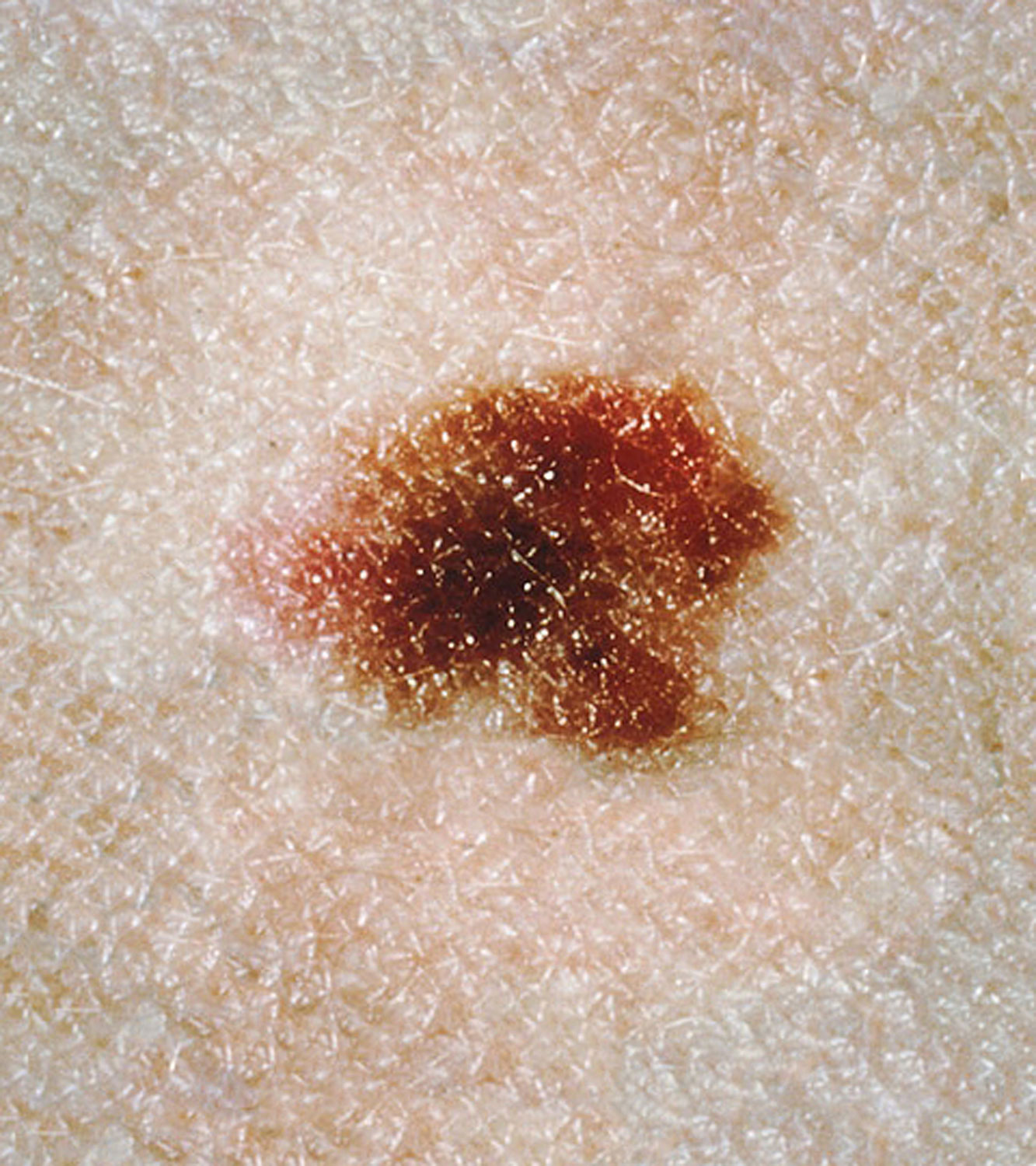
Atypical nevus

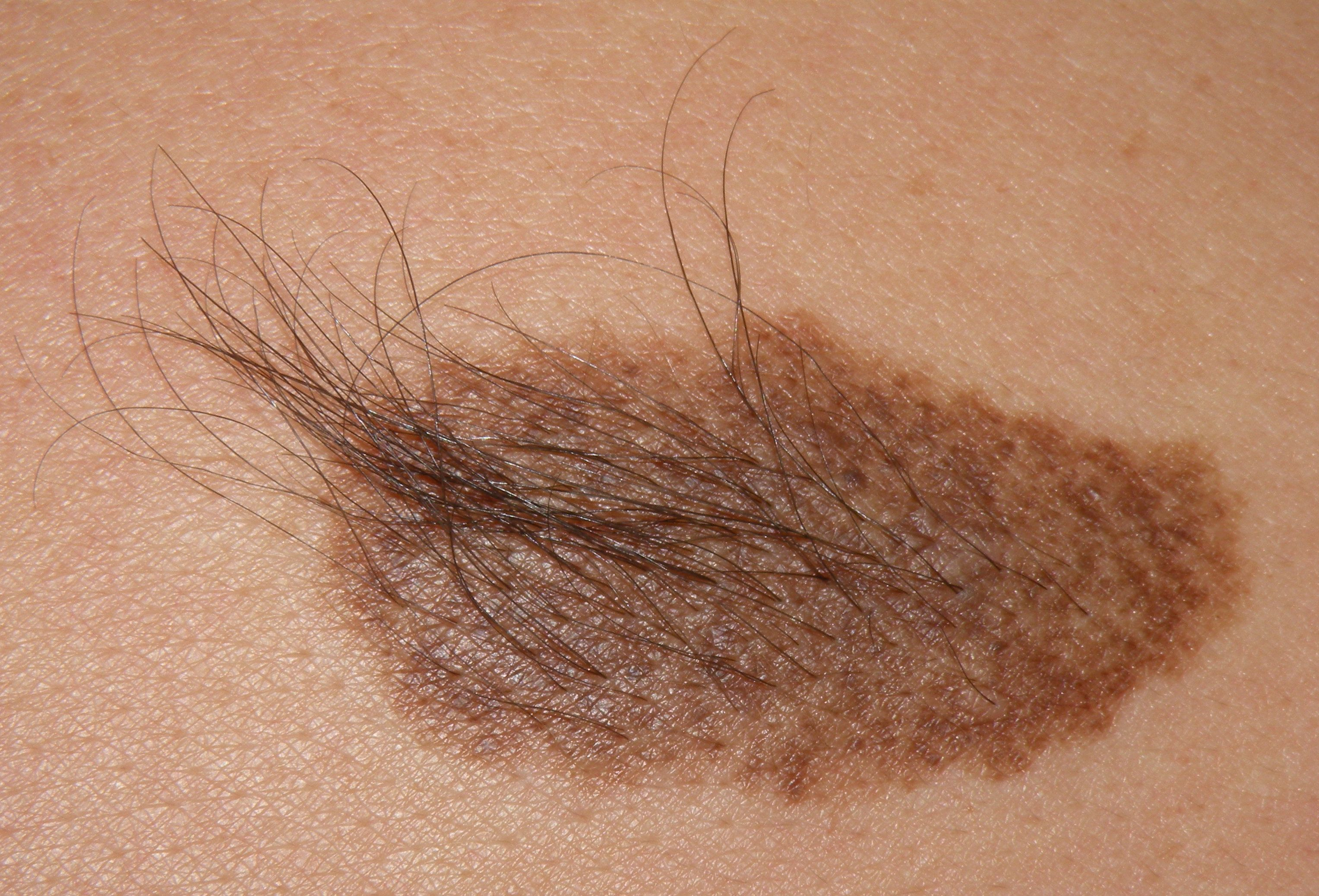
Becker's nevus

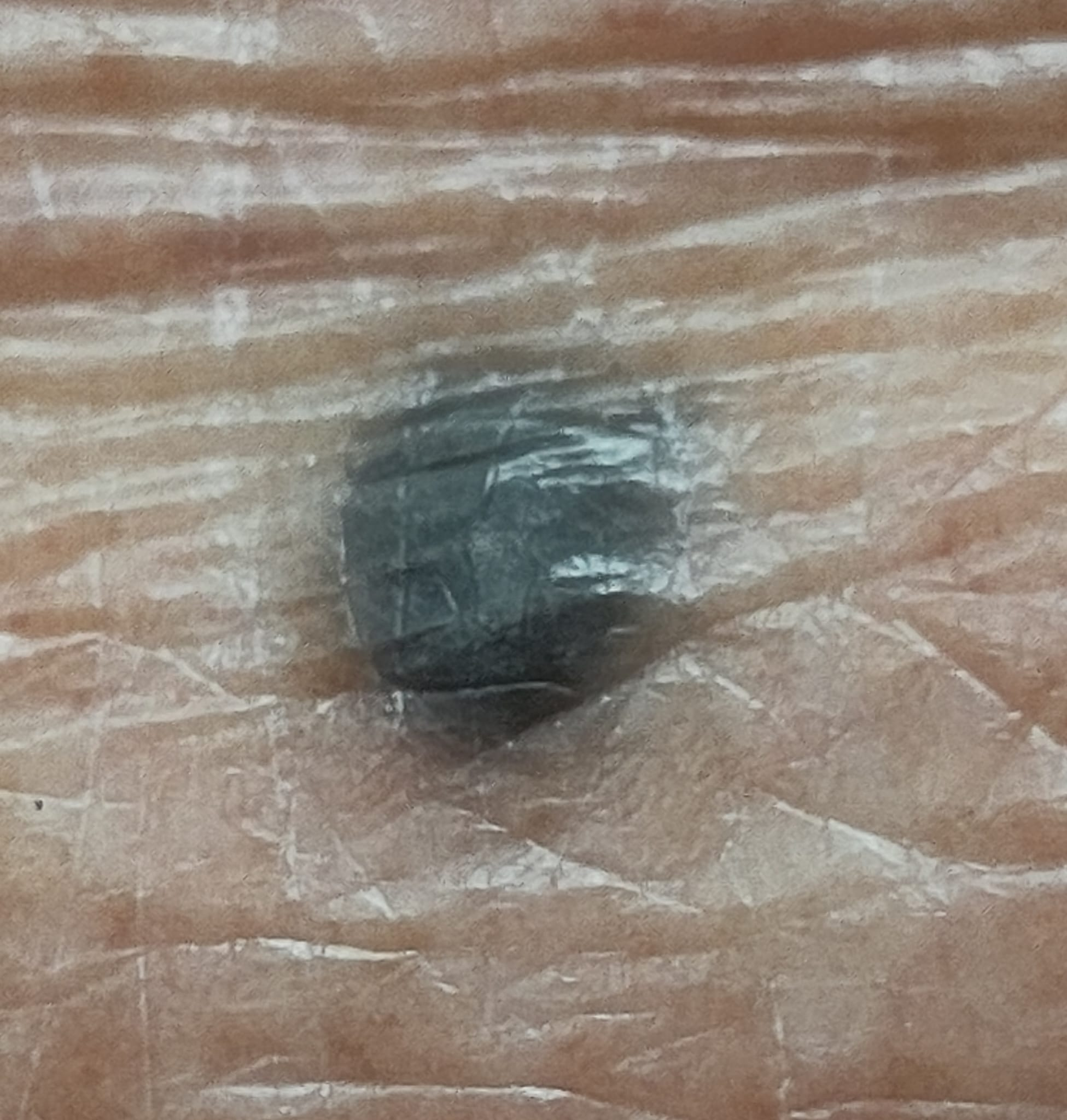
Blue nevus

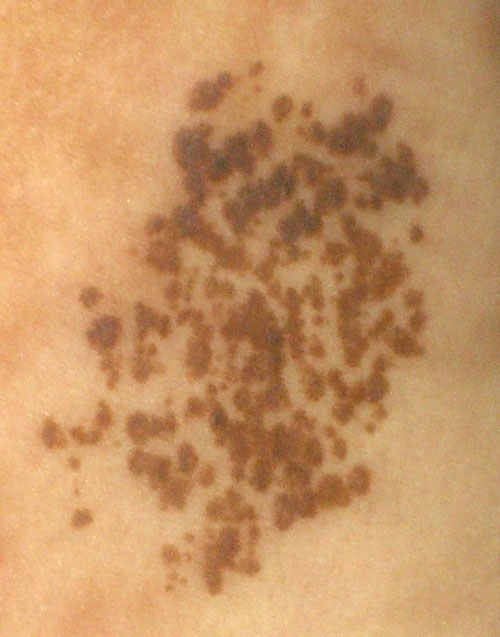
Nevus spilus

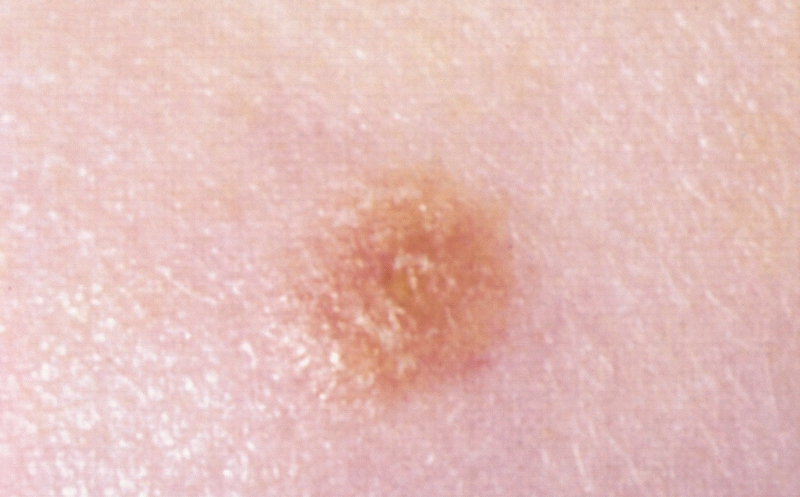
Spitz nevus

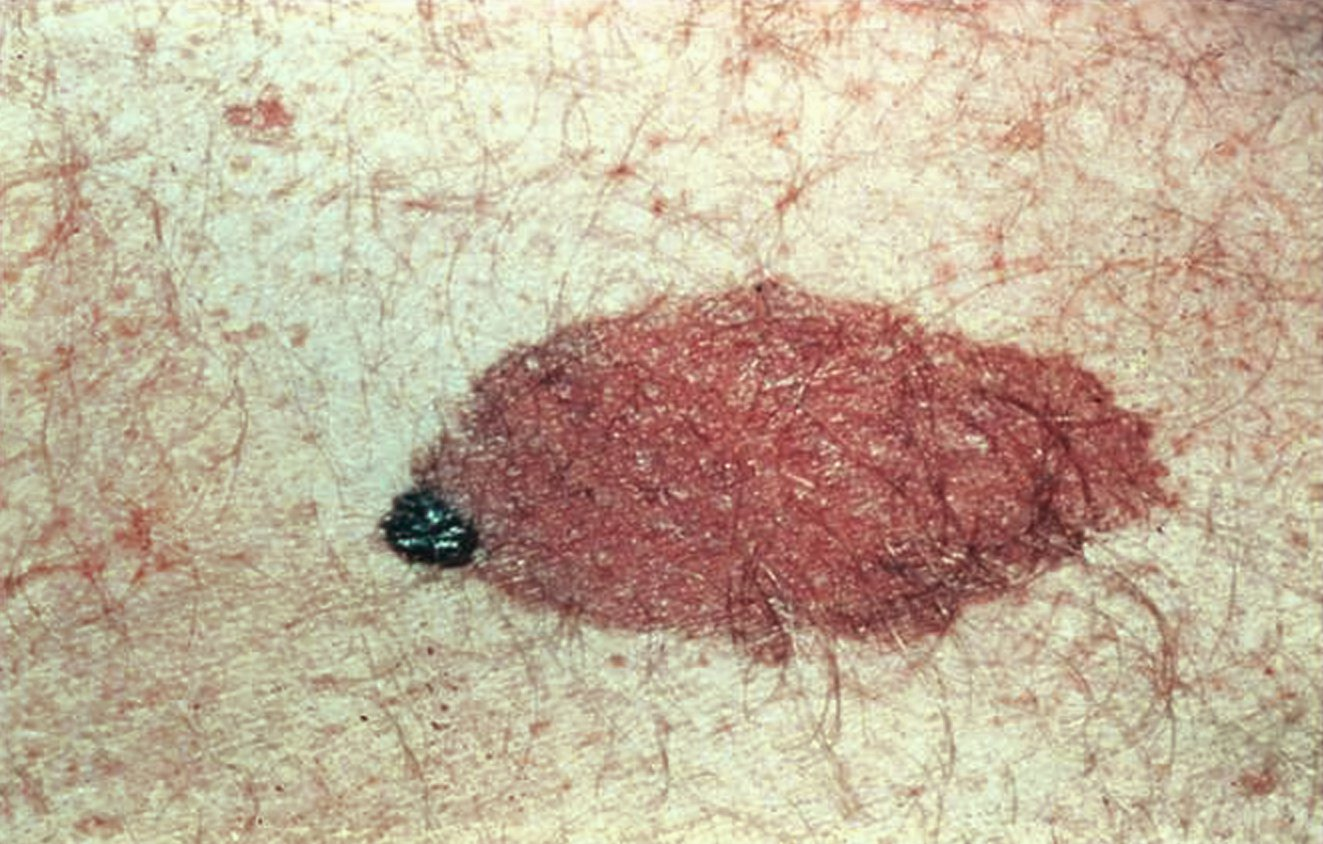
Congenital melanocytic nevus

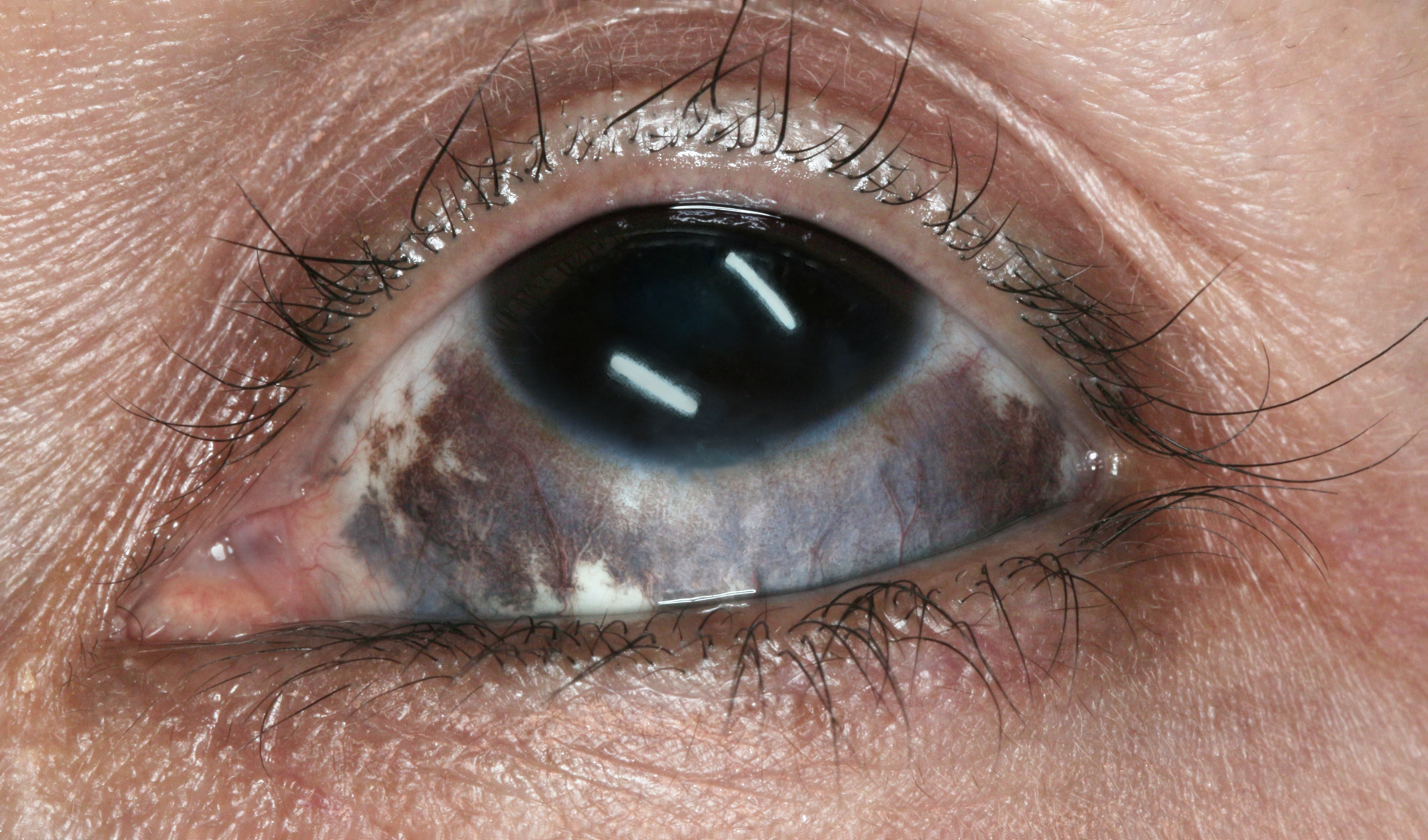
Nevus of Ota

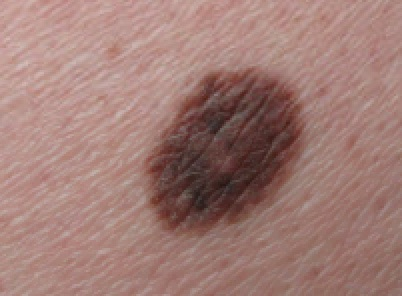
Compound nevus, left buttock

=== Decreased melanin ===
==== Acquired ====
- Nevus anemicus

==== Congenital ====
- Nevus depigmentosus
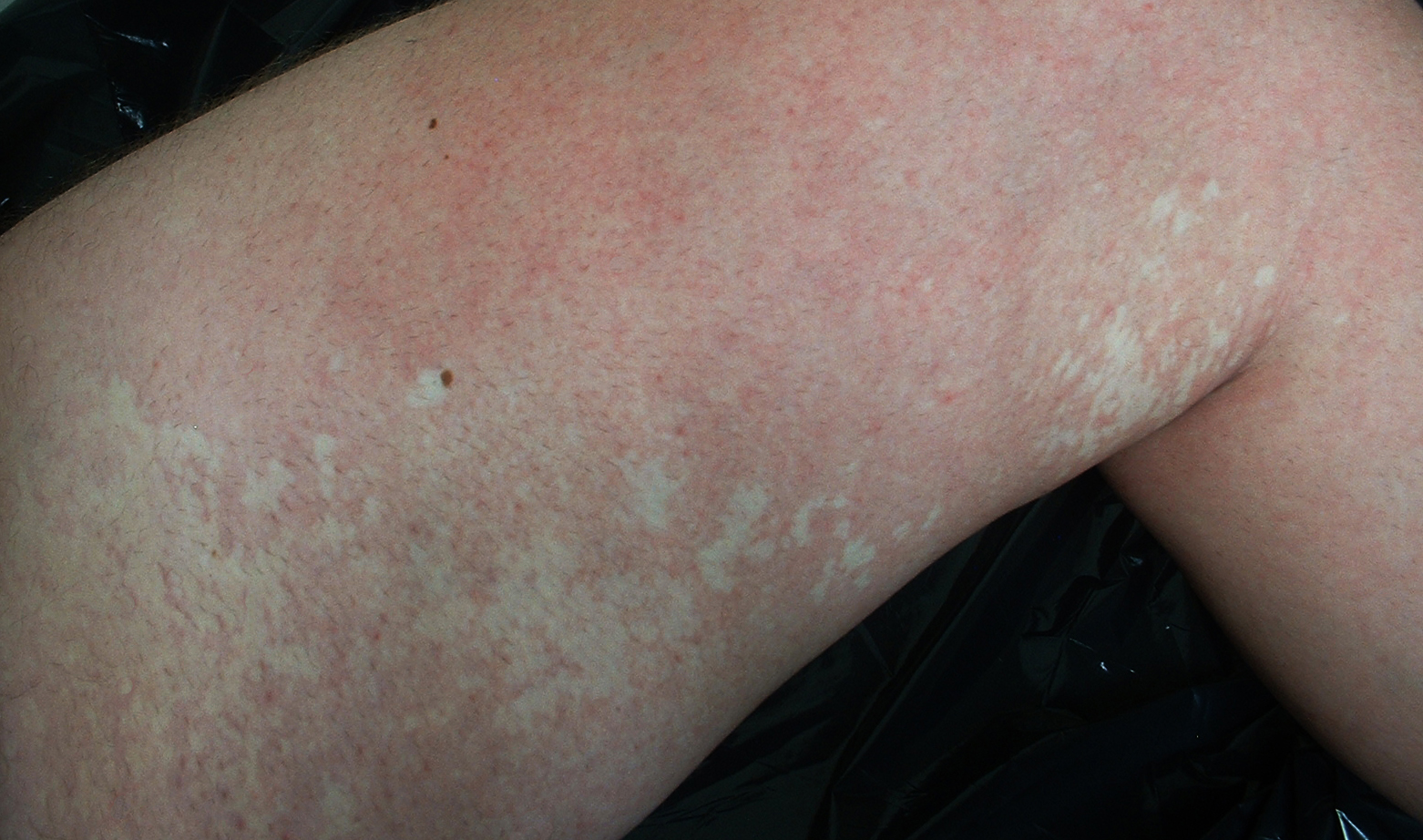
Nevus anemicus

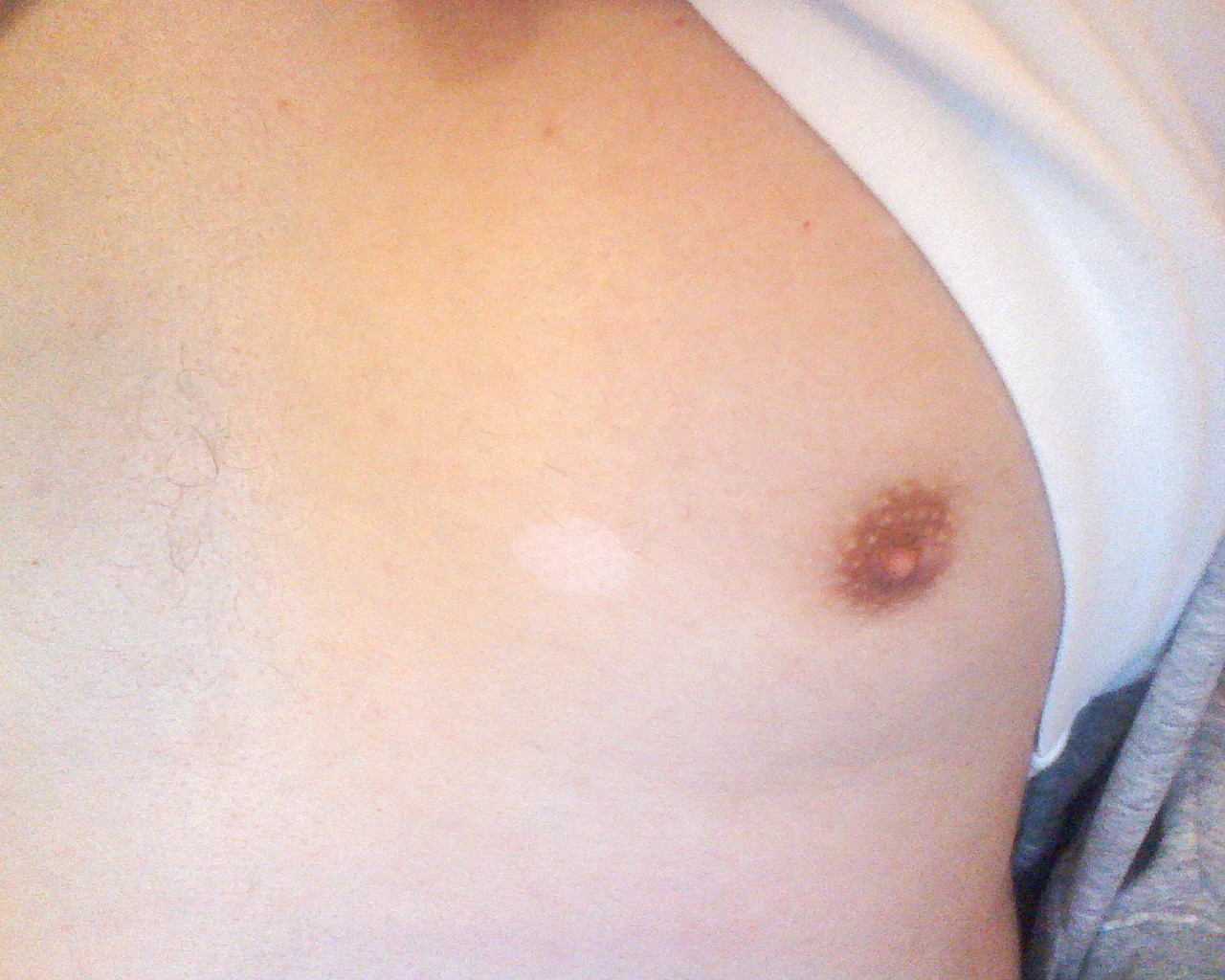
Nevus depigmentosus

Additional types of nevi do not involve disorders of pigmentation or melanocytes. These additional nevi represent hamartomatous proliferations of the epithelium, connective tissue, and vascular malformations.

=== Epidermal nevi ===
These nevi represent excess growth of specific cells types found in the skin, including those that make up oil and sweat glands.

- Verrucous epidermal nevus
- Nevus sebaceous
- Nevus comedonicus
- Eccrine nevus
- Apocrine nevus

=== Connective tissue nevi ===
Connective tissue nevi represent abnormalities of collagen in the dermis, the deep layer of the skin.

- Collagenoma
- Elastoma

=== Vascular nevi ===
These nevi represent excess growth of blood vessels, including capillaries.

- Nevus simplex (nevus flammeus nuchae), also known as a stork bite or salmon patch.
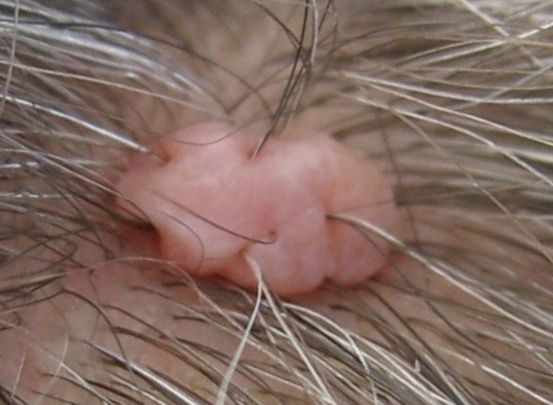
Nevus sebaceous

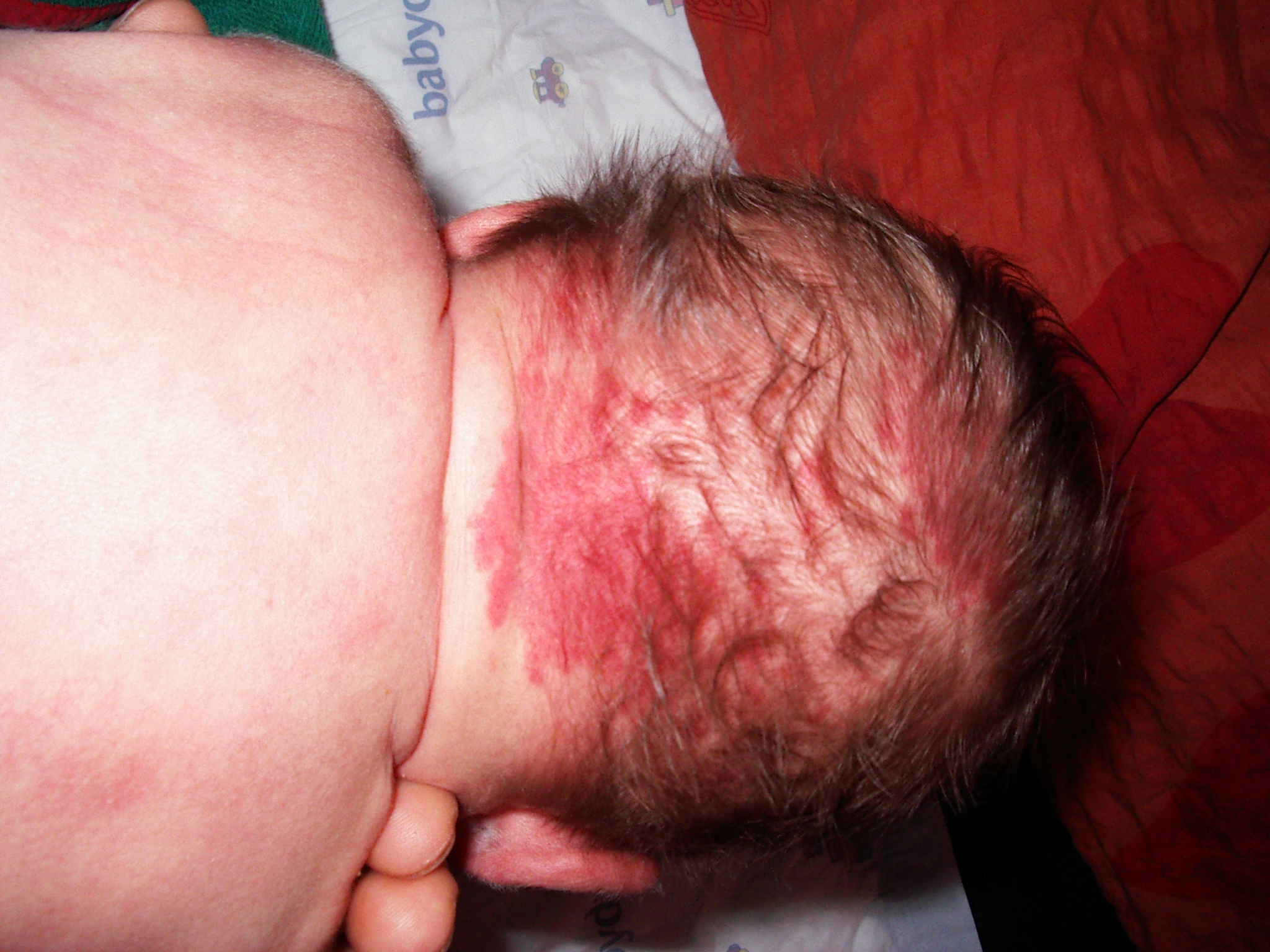
Nevus flammeus nuchae

=== Intramucosal nevi ===
An intramucosal nevus is a nevus within the mucosa as found in for example the mouth and genital areas. In the mouth, they are found most frequently on the hard palate. They are typically light brown and dome-shaped. Intramucosal nevi account for 64% of all reported case of oral nevi.

== Diagnosis ==
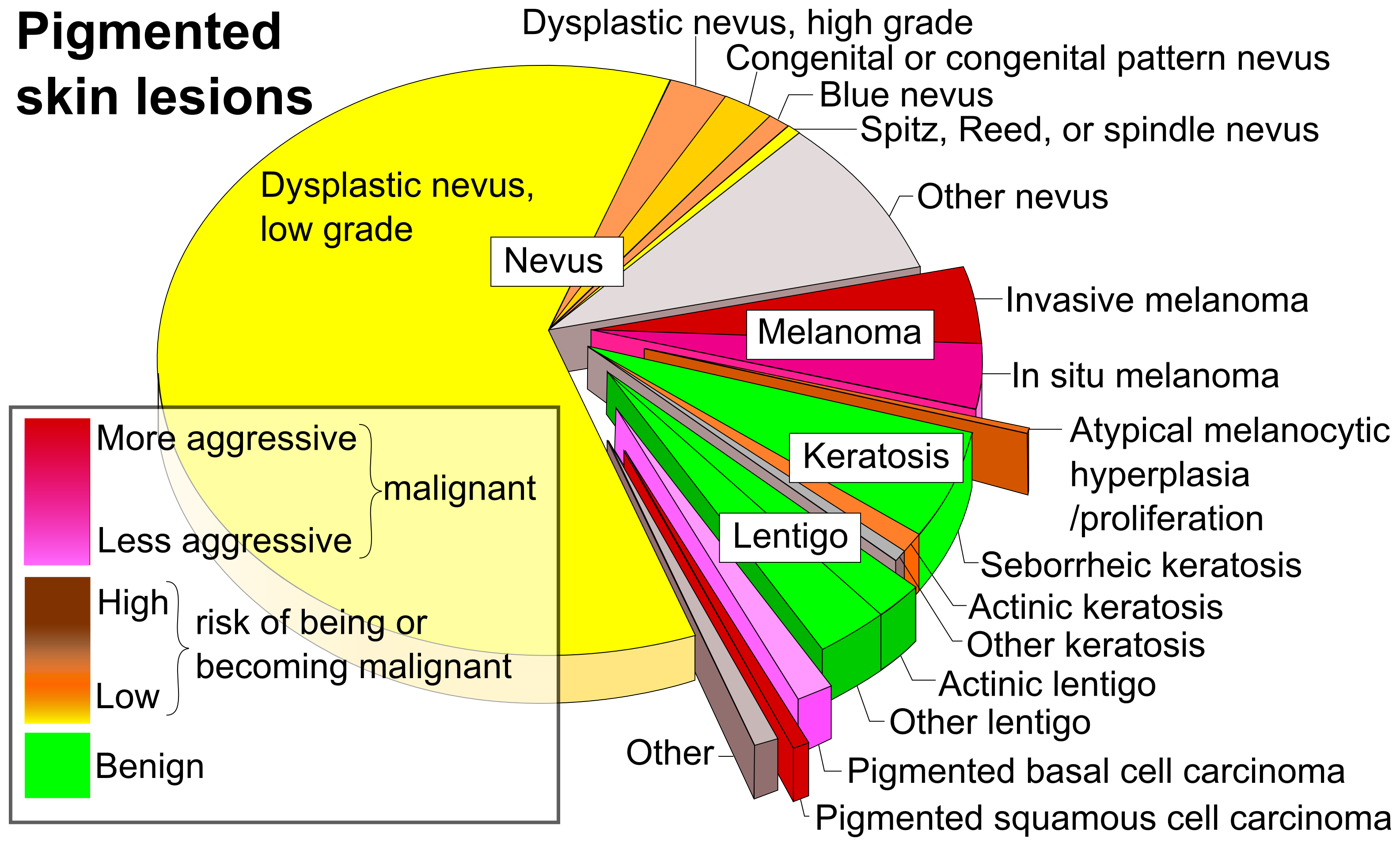
Various differential diagnoses of pigmented skin lesions, by relative rates for biopsied lesions, and malignancy potential, including "nevus" at left and top.

Nevi are typically diagnosed clinically with the naked eye or using dermatoscopy. More advanced imaging tests are available for distinguishing melanocytic nevi from melanoma, including computerized dermoscopy and image analysis. The management of nevi depends on the type of nevus and the degree of diagnostic uncertainty. Some nevi are known to be benign, and may simply be monitored over time. Others may warrant more thorough examination and biopsy for histopathological examination (looking at a sample of skin under a microscope to detect unique cellular features). For example, a clinician may want to determine whether a pigmented nevus is a type of melanocytic nevus, dysplastic nevus, or melanoma as some of these skin lesions pose a risk for malignancy. The ABCDE criteria (asymmetry, border irregularity, color variegation, diameter > 6 mm, and evolution) are often used to distinguish nevi from melanomas in adults, while modified criteria (amelanosis, bleeding or bumps, uniform color, small diameter or de novo, and evolution) can be used when evaluating suspicious lesions in children. In addition to histopathological examination, some lesions may also warrant additional tests to aid in diagnosis, including special stains, immunohistochemistry, and electron microscopy. Typically, the nevi that exist since childhood are harmless.

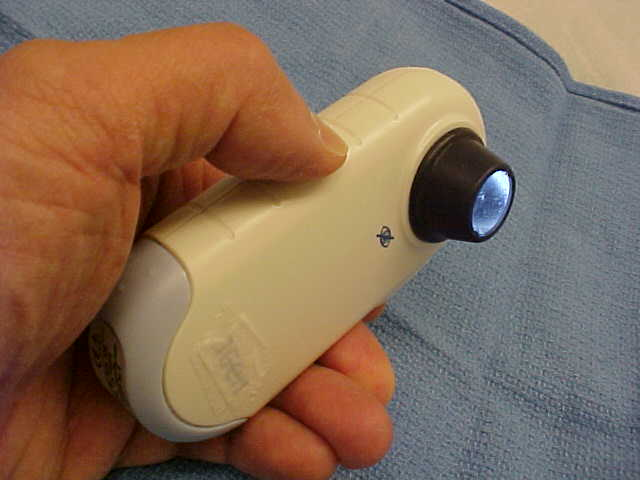
A modern polarized dermatoscope

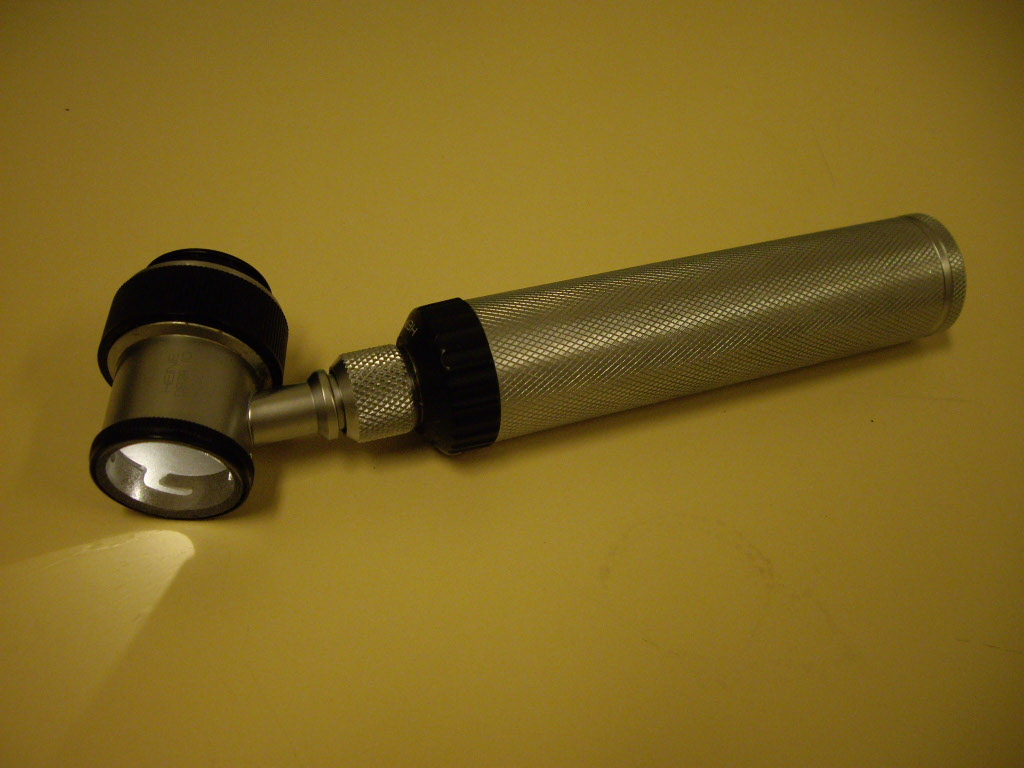
A dermatoscope

=== Differential diagnoses ===
Hypermelanotic nevi must be differentiated from other types of pigmented skin lesions, including:

- Lentigo simplex
- Solar lentigo
- Café au lait macule
- Ink-spot lentigo
- Mucosal melanotic macule
- Mongolian spot (dermal melanocytosis)
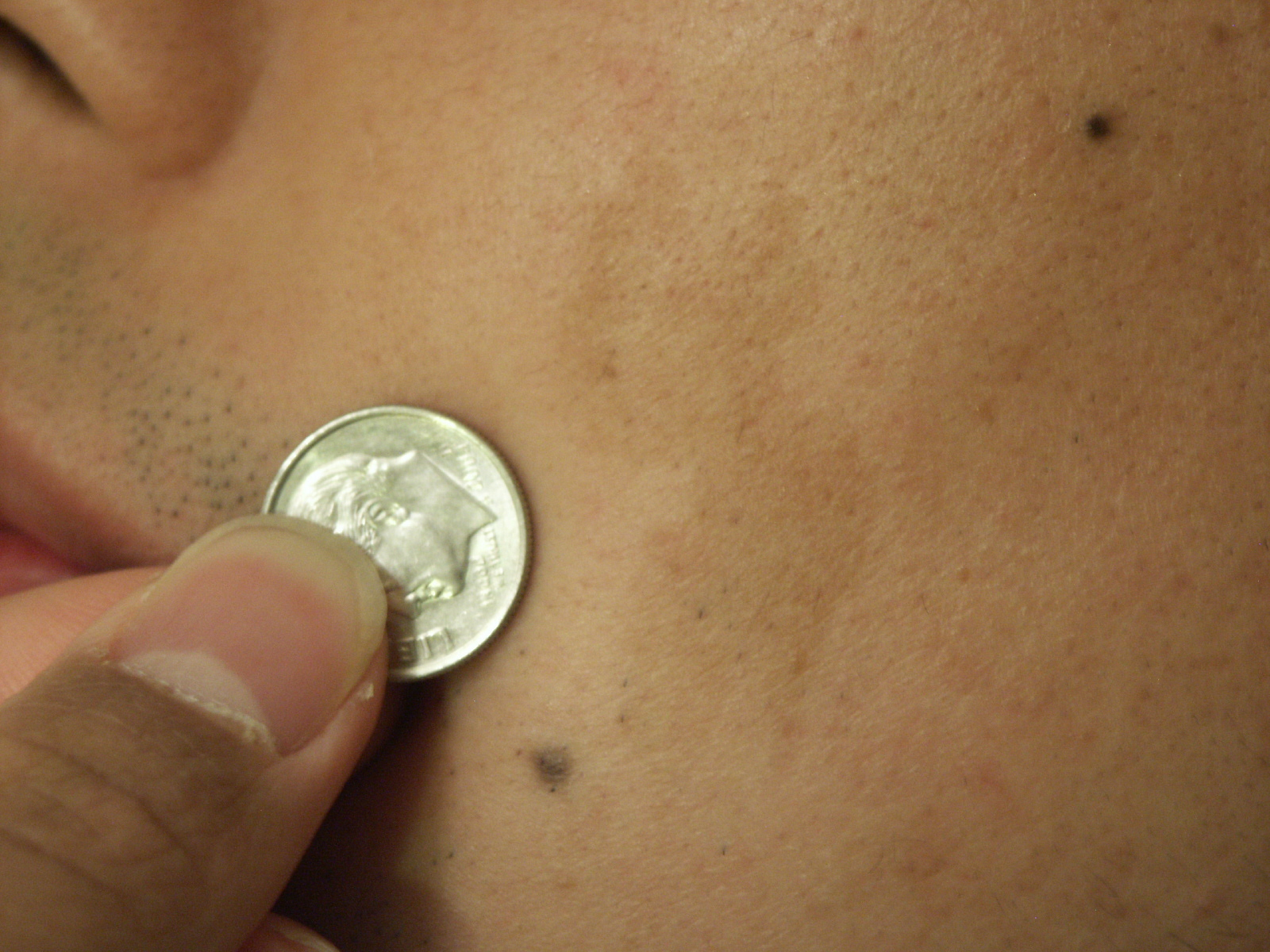
Cafe au lait

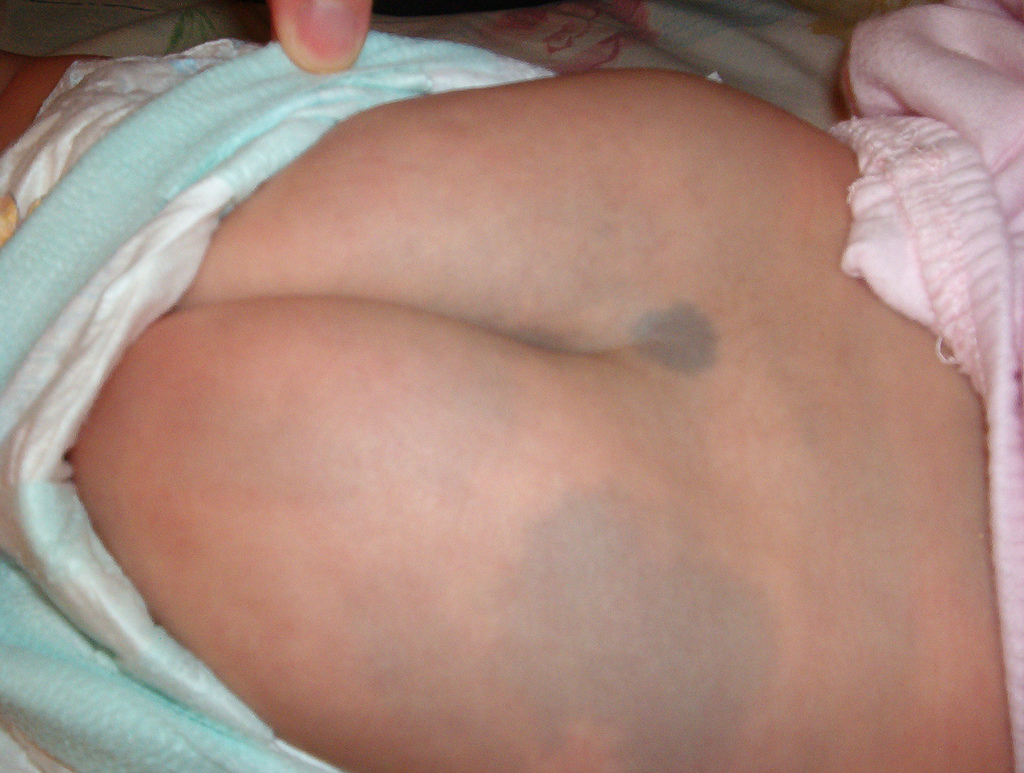
Mongolian spot

== Management ==
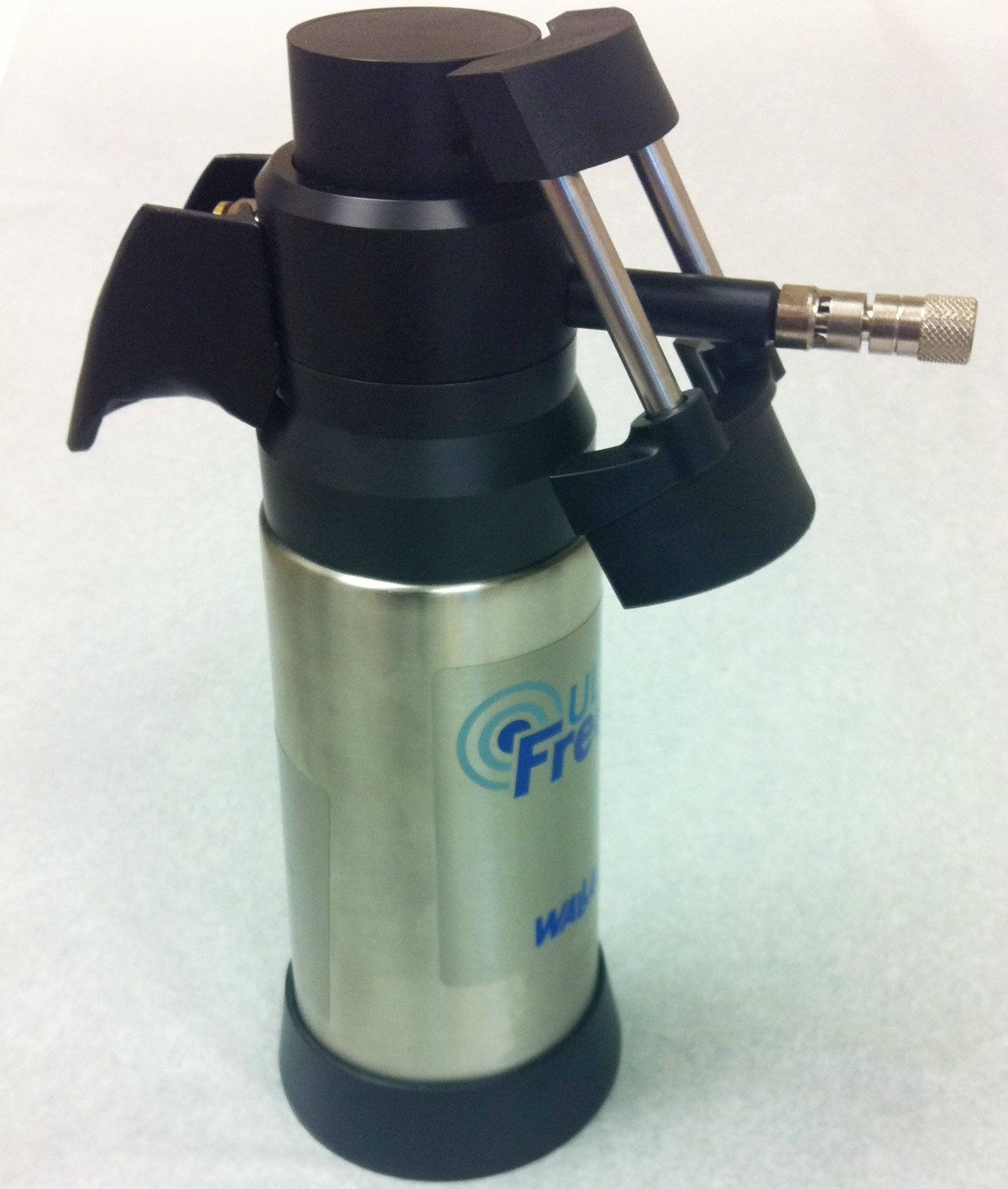
Cryotherapy

The management of a nevus depends on the specific diagnosis, however, the options for treatment generally include the following modalities:

=== Destruction ===
- Chemical peels
- Cryotherapy
- Dermabrasion
- Electrodessication
- Laser ablation

=== Surgery ===
The decision to observe or treat a nevus may depend on a number of factors, including cosmetic concerns, irritative symptoms (e.g., pruritus), ulceration, infection, and concern for potential malignancy.

== Syndromes ==
The term nevus is included in the names of multiple dermatologic syndromes:

- Basal cell nevus syndrome
- Blue rubber bleb nevus syndrome
- Dysplastic nevus syndrome
- Epidermal nevus syndrome
- Linear nevus sebaceous syndrome

== See also ==
- Skin lesion
