= Nevus oligemicus =

- Specialty: Dermatology

Nevus oligemicus presents as a patch of livid skin that is cooler than the normal skin, as a result of decreased blood flow, in which vasoconstriction of deep vessels is thought to be the underlying defect.

== Signs and symptoms ==
In terms of clinical manifestation, the lesions appear as cyanotic, fixed, erythematous-violaceous patches or, in certain situations, as whitish, telangiectatic plaques. These are typically found in the thighs and stomach area, while instances have also been reported on the hands, chest, and thighs. The primary clinical feature is the continued presence of cold skin to the touch when there isn't any obvious vascular ischemia nearby.

== Causes ==
There are no known triggers other than taking cold baths. Obesity and inactive lifestyles have been identified as risk factors.

== Mechanism ==
Although the exact cause of the pathogenesis is unknown, aberrant vascular receptors appear to be the cause. This leads to changes in adrenergic activity, an increase in sympathetic tone, and ultimately vasoconstriction and a slowdown of deep dermal vascular flow. The chilly temperature over the lesion surface could be caused by these causes.

== Diagnosis ==
Skin temperature, which is typically at least 2°C lower than the surrounding skin, is the primary diagnostic indicator. The diagnosis is primarily clinical, but if histology is done, it reveals blockage of the reticular dermal vessels and dilatation of the papillary dermal vessels with a normal number of vessels.

== See also ==
- Nevus anemicus
- List of cutaneous conditions
