= Vasospastic macule =

- Specialty: Dermatology

Vasospastic macules are a skin condition due to localized vasoconstriction and are seen most often in young women.

== See also ==
- Nevus anemicus
- List of cutaneous conditions
