= Lenticle =

Lenticle may refer to:

- A small lens.
- A glass panel in a clock case through which one can see the movement of the pendulum.
- A lens-shaped layer of mineral or rock embedded in a different material.
- Lenticels: small brown corky spots on the surface of stems and roots of plants.
- A freckle or other pigmented spot.
