= Skin marking =

Skin marking may refer to:

- Scarifying, scratching, etching, burning / branding, or cutting designs, pictures, or words into the skin as a permanent body modification.
- Hyperkeratosis, a skin condition
- Cutaneous condition, any of various skin conditions
- Mole (skin marking), a benign tumor on human skin, usually with darker pigment
- Tattoo
- Body art
