= Lentiginosis =

- Specialty: Dermatology

Lentiginosis refers to the presence of lentigines in large numbers or in a distinctive configuration. These are spotted areas created by accumulation in the skin due to sun exposure. Due to a high irregularity any distinction from randomness defines lentiginosis. Although lentigines are benign, they be the signal of an underlying problem such as progressive cardiomyopathic lentiginosis, which can cause retardation in children.

== See also ==
- Lentigines
- Skin cancer
- List of cutaneous conditions
