= Generalized lentiginosis =

- Other names: Familial multiple lentigines syndrome without systemic involvement
- Generalized lentiginosis is inherited in an autosomal dominant manner
- Specialty: Dermatology

Generalized lentiginosis is a cutaneous condition that will occasionally present without other associated abnormalities. It may be caused by carney complex, Noonan syndrome with multiple lentigines or Peutz–Jeghers syndrome.

== See also ==
- Lentigo
- Skin lesion
