= Vitiligo ponctué =

- Specialty: Dermatology

Vitiligo ponctué is a cutaneous condition, an unusual form of vitiligo, characterized by small confetti-like or tiny, discrete macules that may occur on otherwise normal or unusually darkened skin.

== See also ==
- Quadrichrome vitiligo
- List of cutaneous conditions
