= Centrofacial lentiginosis =

- Specialty: Dermatology

Centrofacial lentiginosis is a cutaneous condition characterized by lentigines on the nose and adjacent cheeks.

The condition is associated with sacral hypertrichosis, developmental delay, seizures, absent middle incisors, skeletal, abnormalities, dwarfism, endocrine dysfunction and congenital mitral valve stenosis.

== See also ==
- Lentigo
- Skin lesion
