= Lentigo =

Small pigment spots on skin

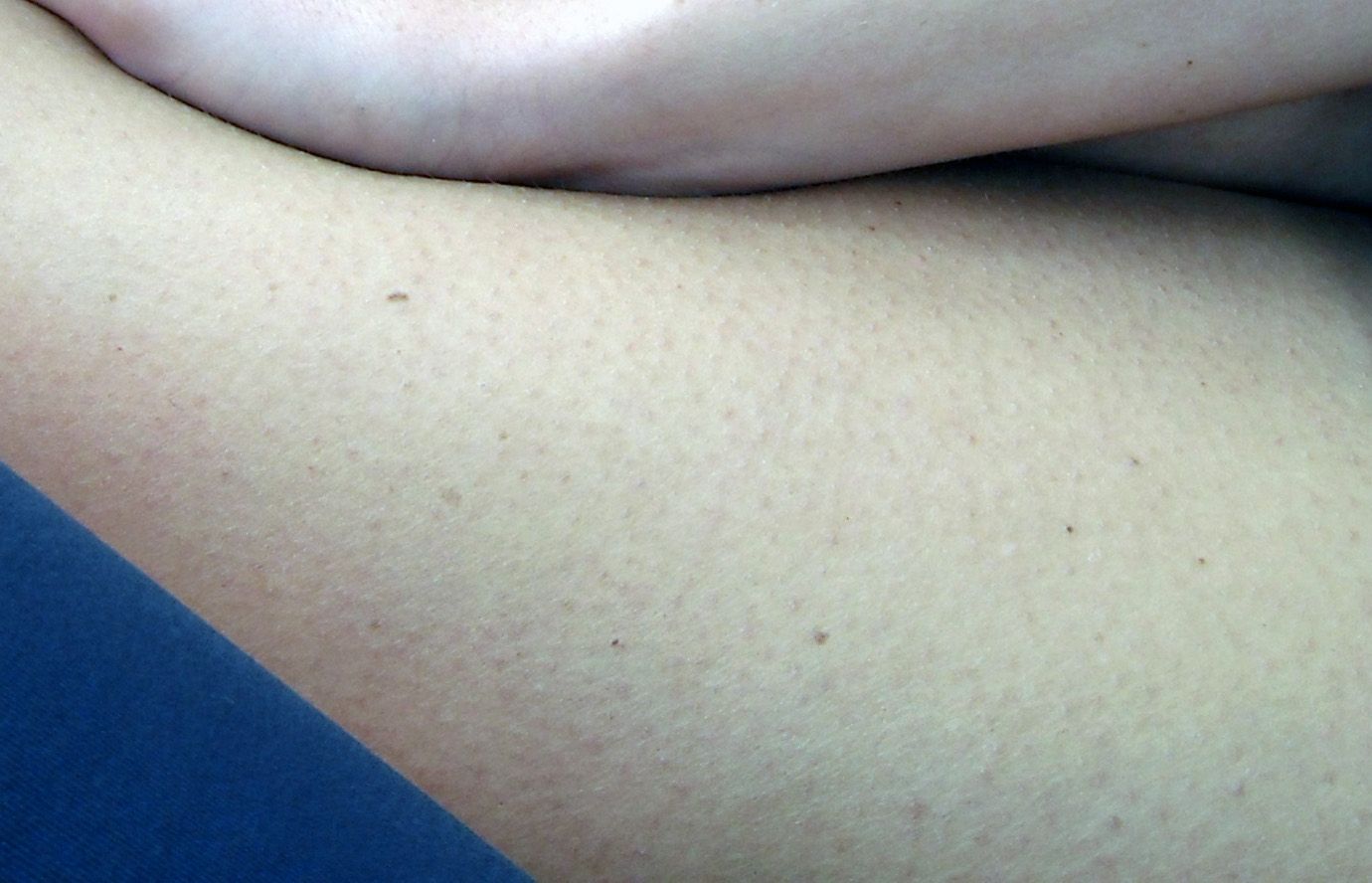
- A mild form of lentigo simplex
- Specialty: Family medicine

A lentigo (/lɛnˈtaɪɡoʊ/; plural lentigines, /lɛnˈtɪdʒɪniːz/) is a small pigmented spot on the skin with a clearly defined edge, surrounded by normal-appearing skin. It is a harmless (benign) hyperplasia of melanocytes which is linear in its spread. This means the hyperplasia of melanocytes is restricted to the cell layer directly above the basement membrane of the epidermis where melanocytes normally reside. This is in contrast to the "nests" of multi-layer melanocytes found in moles (melanocytic nevi). Because of this characteristic feature, the adjective lentiginous is used to describe other skin lesions that similarly proliferate linearly within the basal cell layer.

== Diagnosis ==
Conditions characterized by lentigines include:

- Lentigo simplex
- Solar lentigo (Liver spots)
- PUVA lentigines
- Ink spot lentigo
- LEOPARD syndrome
- Mucosal lentigines
- Multiple lentigines syndrome
- Moynahan syndrome
- Generalized lentiginosis
- Centrofacial lentiginosis
- Carney complex
- Inherited patterned lentiginosis in black persons
- Partial unilateral lentiginosis
- Peutz–Jeghers syndrome
- Lentigo maligna
- Lentigo maligna melanoma
- Acral lentiginous melanoma

=== Differential diagnosis ===
Lentigines are distinguished from freckles (ephelis) based on the proliferation of melanocytes. Freckles have a relatively normal number of melanocytes but an increased amount of melanin. A lentigo has an increased number of melanocytes. Freckles will increase in number and darkness with sunlight exposure, whereas lentigines will stay stable in their color regardless of sunlight exposure.

== Treatment ==
Lentigines by themselves are benign, however one might desire the removal or treatment of some of them for cosmetic purposes. In this case they can be removed surgically, or lightened with the use of topical depigmentation agents. Some common depigmentation agents such as azelaic acid and kojic acid seem to be inefficient in this case, however other agents might work well (4% hydroquinone, 5% topical cysteamine, 10% topical ascorbic acid).

== See also ==
- Freckle
- List of skin diseases
- Mole
- Skin disease
- Skin lesion
