= Inherited patterned lentiginosis =

- Other names: Familial lentigines profusa
- Autosomal dominant is the inheritance manner of this condition
- Specialty: Dermatology

Inherited patterned lentiginosis is an inherited skin condition that results in widespread small, flat areas of more-pigmented skin with clearly defined borders, generally noticed when the affected person is an infant or young child. The inheritance pattern is autosomal dominant, and organs other than the skin are not affected; therefore, it is distinct from Carney complex.
