= Pigmented spindle cell nevus =

Benign skin tumor

- Other names: Pigmented spindle cell tumor of Reed, pigmented variant of Spitz nevus
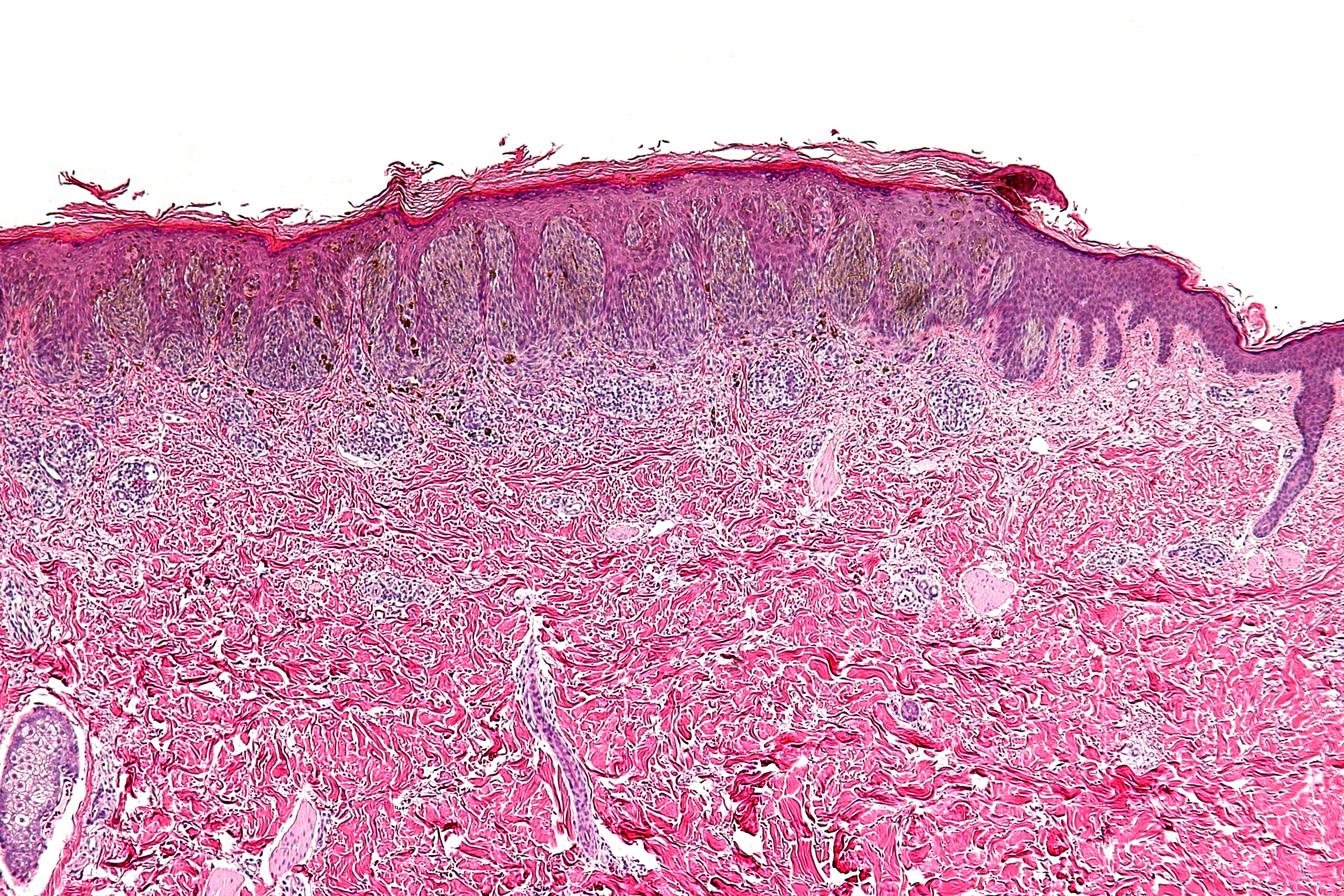
- Micrograph of a pigmented spindle cell nevus (top of image). H&E stain.
- Specialty: Dermatology

A pigmented spindle cell nevus is a skin condition characterized by a dark brown to black macule or papule, usually less than 6 mm.

It was characterized in 1975.

== See also ==
- Partial unilateral lentiginosis
- List of cutaneous conditions
- Spitz nevus
