= Mucosal lentigines =

- Other names: Labial, penile, and vulvar melanosis, and melanotic macules
- Specialty: Dermatology

Mucosal lentigines is a cutaneous condition characterized by light brown macules on mucosal surfaces.

== See also ==
- Lentigo
- Skin lesion
