= Lentigo simplex =

- Other names: Simple lentigo
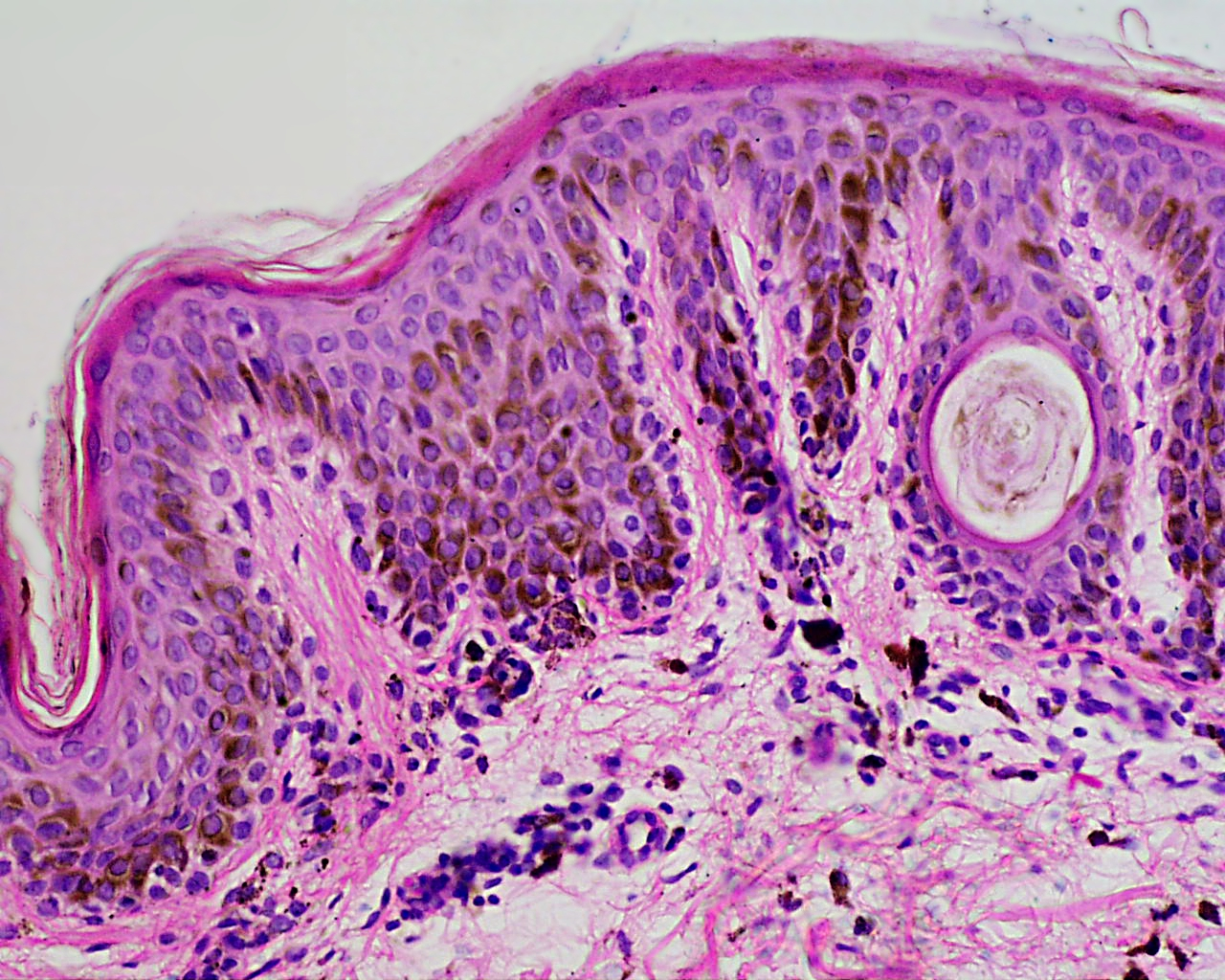
- Lentigo simplex or simple lentigo
- Specialty: Dermatology

Lentigo simplex is the most common form of lentigo. A single lesion or multiple lesions (lentigines) may be present at birth or more commonly first develop in early childhood. Lentigo simplex is not induced by sun exposure, and it is not associated with any medical diseases or conditions. It is also referred to as simple lentigo and juvenile lentigo. This condition also affects cats, those with orange coloration most often, and can appear on the nose, lips, and eyes as the cat ages.

== See also ==
- Balloon cell nevus
- List of cutaneous conditions
