= Partial unilateral lentiginosis =

Skin condition of pigment spots on only one half of the body

- Other names: Segmental lentiginosis
- Specialty: Dermatology

Partial unilateral lentiginosis is a cutaneous condition characterized by lentigines located on only one half of the body.

== See also ==
- Lentigo
- List of cutaneous conditions
