= Ink spot lentigo =

- Other names: Sunburn lentigo
- Specialty: Dermatology

Ink spot lentigo is a cutaneous condition characterized by skin lesions commonly occurring on the shoulders. These lesions often cause alarm but are benign. They are an indication of excessive sun exposure so although ink spot lentigo is not premalignant, people with several of them maybe at increased risk of skin cancer due to UV damage. For a safe diagnosis, they must be flat. Although the shape is irregular, the structure as seen on dermoscopy is very homogeneous.

== See also ==
- Lentigo
- Skin lesion
