= Age spot =

Age-related skin blemish

- Other names: Liver spot, solar lentigo, lentigo senilis
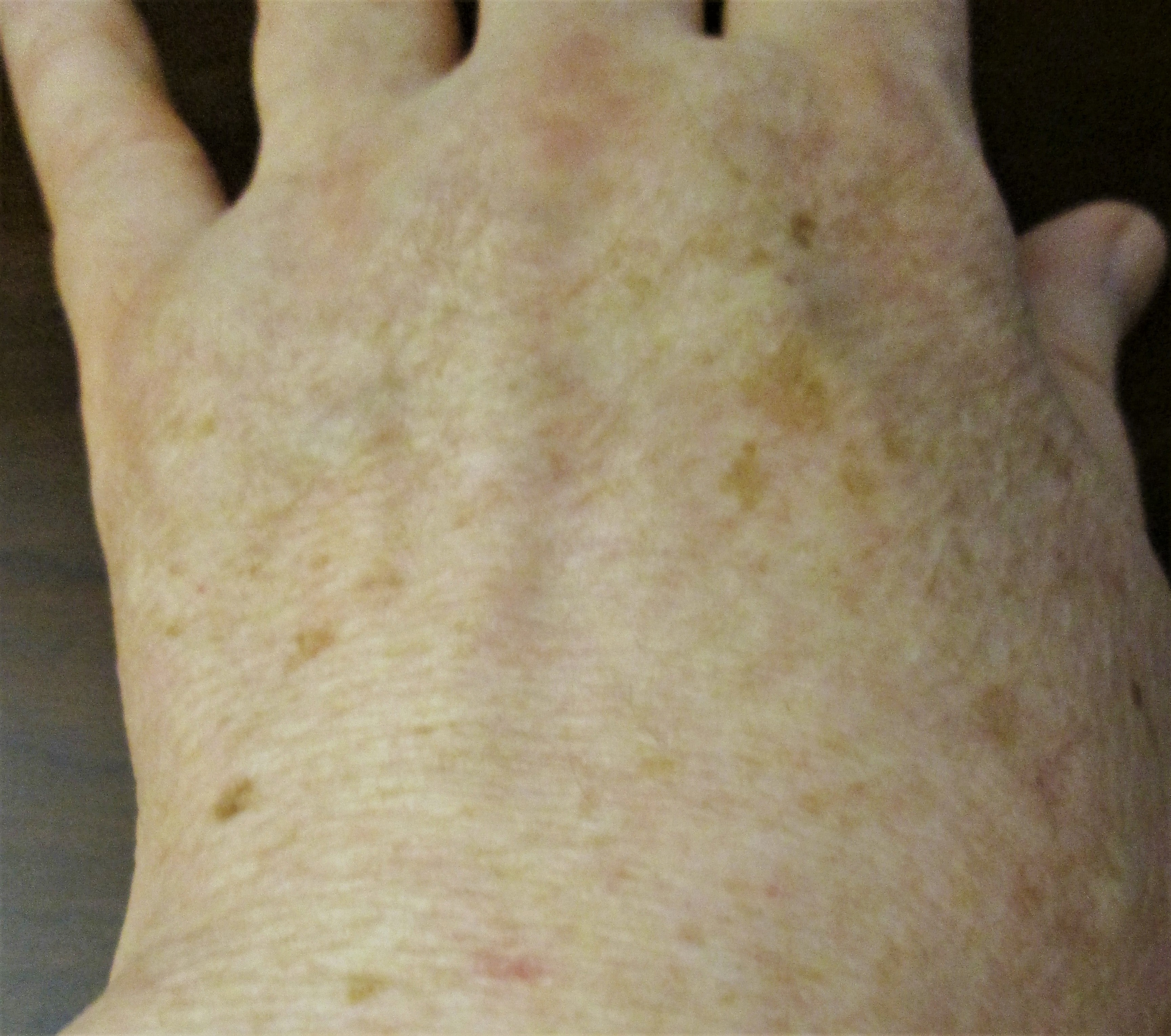
- Age spots on the left hand of a 63-year-old light-skinned Caucasian man
- Specialty: Dermatology
- Causes: Prolonged exposure to UV radiation
- Prevention: Sun screen

Age spots (also known as liver spot, solar lentigo, "lentigo senilis", "old age spot", "senile freckle") are blemishes on the skin associated with aging and caused by exposure to ultraviolet radiation from the sun. They range in color from light brown to red or black and are located in areas most often exposed to the sun, particularly the hands, face, shoulders, arms and forehead, and the scalp if bald.

The spots were once called liver spots as they were incorrectly believed to be caused by liver problems, but they are physiologically unrelated to the liver, save for a similar color. They form after years of sun exposure.

In the overwhelming majority of cases, age spots pose no threat and require no treatment, though they occasionally have been known to obscure the detection of skin cancer. However, despite being a benign condition, age spots are sometimes considered unsightly and some people choose to have them removed. This can be done by electrosurgery, laser treatment, cryotherapy, or the use of depigmentation agents, such as hydroquinone, tretinoin, topical cysteamine, azelaic acid, or alpha hydroxy acids.

== Causes ==
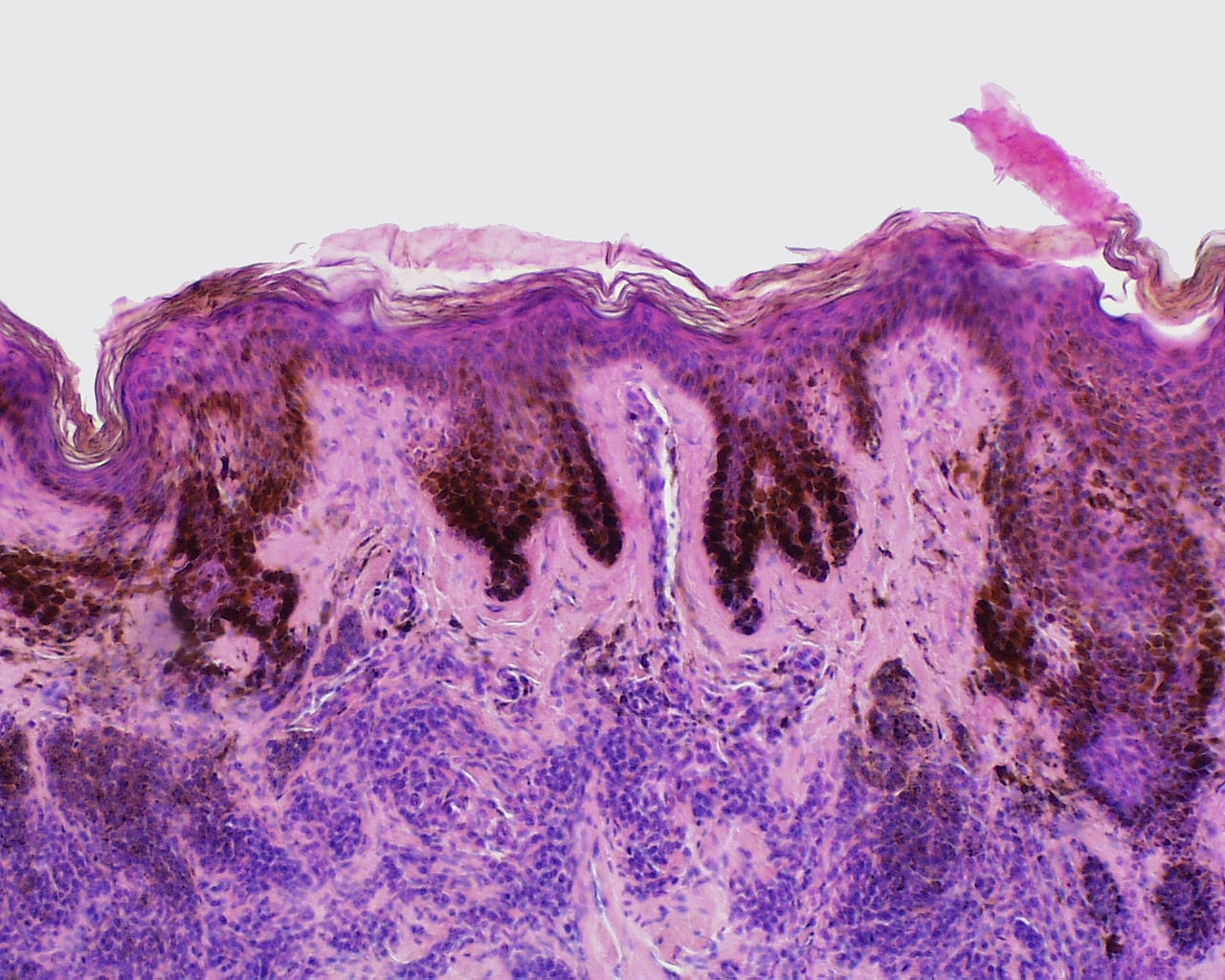
Histology slide of a solar lentigo

Differently from the melanotic nevi and the verrucous nevi on the skin, age spots change in color and in shape with time. Wang-Michelitsch and Michelitsch propose a hypothesis inspired by their misrepair-accumulation aging theory for the development of age spots. They propose that aged basal cells contain lipofuscin bodies that cannot be removed and might promote the aging of neighboring cells, generating a feedback loop that causes more and more neighbor cells to become aged and contain lipofuscins. Such cells might then aggregate into a spot with an irregular shape.

Another group has reported that "age spots" taken from human skin biopsies of patients facial senile lentigo of Fitzpatrick skin type III or IV aged 55–62 are enriched with senescent fibroblasts compared to surrounding skin. The dark coloration appeared to be due to higher melanin levels and activity of tyrosinase in the senescent fibroblasts than in the controls, potentially related to lower SDF1 expression. Patients were then administered six weekly treatments of microneedle fractional radiofrequency aimed at eliminating dermal senescent fibroblasts; this led to a marked decrease in epidermal pigmentation compared to baseline, accompanied by a decrease in the synthesis of collagen and the normalization of suppressed SDF1 expression.

== Prevention ==
Broad spectrum sunscreen that protects against both UVA and UVB radiation protect against age spots. Wearing a hat can prevent sun spots from forming on the face.

== Treatment ==
Treatment for age spots is almost never done for health-related reasons, though it is sometimes done for cosmetic ones. Skin-bleaching products that inhibit pigmentation or cosmetic creams containing the ingredients alpha hydroxy acids or retinoids are known to be effective. Age spots can also be frozen off with liquid nitrogen; that is, via cryosurgery.

== See also ==
- Freckle
- Lentigo
- Melasma
- List of cutaneous conditions
