= Alphos =

Alphos (from Greek ἀλφός alphos "a dull white leprosy") is a form of non-contagious leprosy, formerly described by the physician Celsus under the name of vitiligo, a term now used for another skin disease. In alphos, the skin is rough, and looks as if it had drops of white on it, not much differing from morphea.

It is referenced in the Greek translation of Leviticus 13:39.
