= Quadrichrome vitiligo =

- Specialty: Dermatology

Quadrichrome vitiligo is another variant of vitiligo, a cutaneous condition, which reflects the presence of a fourth color (dark brown) at sites of perifollicular repigmentation.

== See also ==
- ABCD syndrome
- List of cutaneous conditions
- Trichrome vitiligo
- Skin lesion
