= Nevus anemicus =

Nevus Anemicus
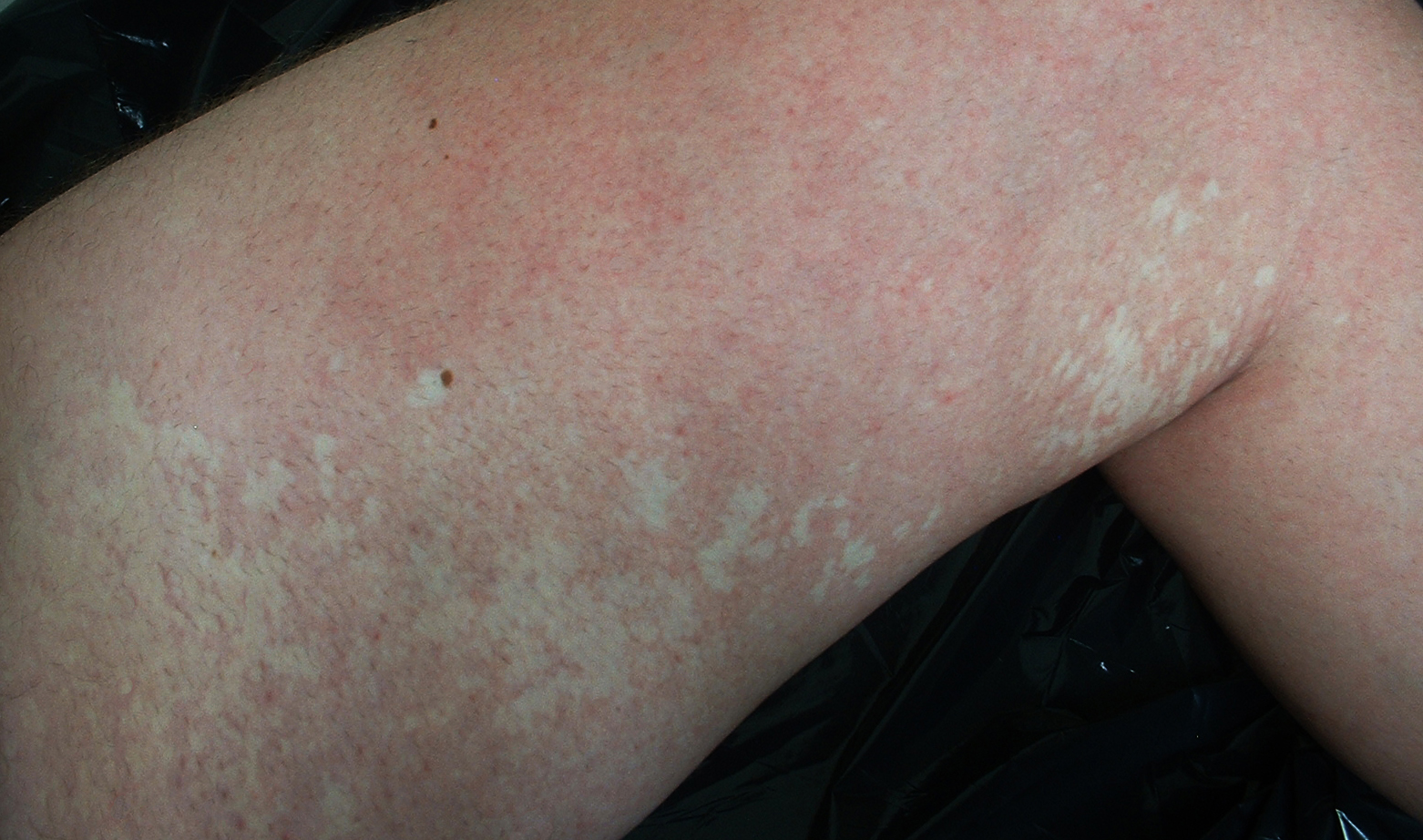
- A man's left leg with nevus anemicus patches.
- Specialty: Dermatology

Nevus anemicus is a congenital disorder characterized by macules of varying size and shape that are paler than the surrounding skin and cannot be made red by trauma, cold, or heat. The paler area is due to the blood vessels within the area which are more sensitive to the body’s normal vasoconstricting chemicals.

== Signs and symptoms ==
This benign patch appears on the skin at birth or in early childhood. In most people these are under 10 centimeters (3.9 in) in size. If there is doubt about the diagnosis, rubbing the area causes the skin around the lesion to become red while the lesion itself does not change in color. Often the patches are difficult to see against the background color of the patient’s skin, but if sunburn develops, then the white area stands out prominently. The involved area is lighter than the normal skin, not because of a loss of pigment occurs, but because blood vessels are constricted, producing a permanent blanching of the area. This blanching is a functional rather than a structural abnormality, presumed to be caused by local increased sensitivity to catecholamines. Although the cutaneous vasculature appears normal histologically, the blood vessels within the nevus do not respond to injection of vasodilators. It has been postulated that the persistent pallor may represent a sustained localized adrenergic vasoconstriction. Results of a skin biopsy would be interpreted as normal and only physiological testing can reveal the nevus in contrast to normal skin. Stroking the patch elicits no red flare. Only the normal skin would react with a characteristic erythematous response. Examination under a Wood lamp can also reveal the nevus anemicus patch will not emphasize as a patch of vitiligo would.

== Diagnosis ==
Nevus anemicus is diagnosed based on clinical characteristics and by ruling out other possible causes, and sometimes by a skin biopsy.

== Treatment ==
Since the histopathology of nevus anemicus is normal, nevus anemicus is a pharmacologic nevus and not an anatomic one. In most people a nevus anemicus is on a covered area and so light in appearance that no treatment is needed.

== See also ==
- List of cutaneous conditions
- Melanism
- Nevus
- Skin lesion
