= Schimmelpenning syndrome =

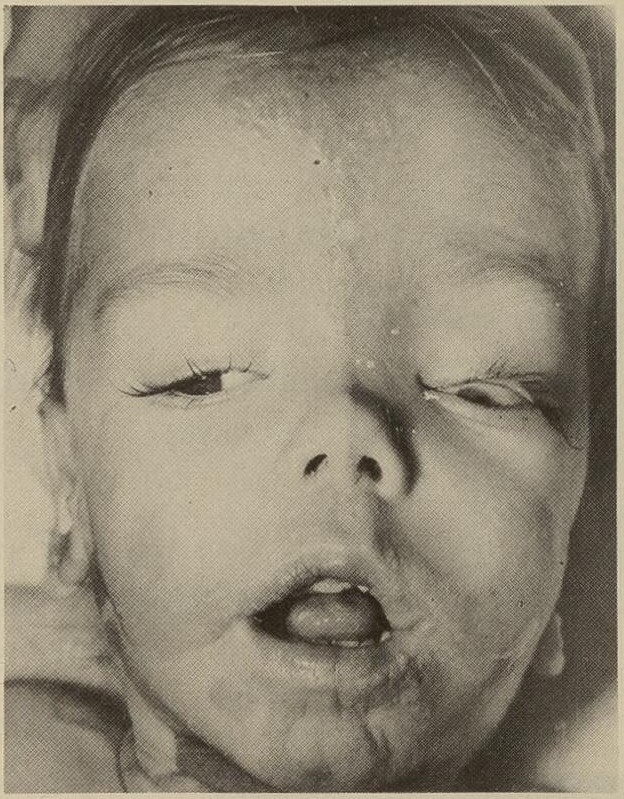
- Child with Schimmelpenning syndrome
- Specialty: Medical genetics

Schimmelpenning syndrome is a neurocutaneous condition characterized by one or more sebaceous nevi, usually appearing on the face or scalp, associated with anomalies of the central nervous system, ocular system, skeletal system, cardiovascular system and genitourinary system.

Synonyms include: "Linear nevus sebaceous syndrome (LNSS)", "Schimmelpenning-Feuerstein-Mims syndrome", "Feuerstein-Mims syndrome", "sebaceous nevus syndrome", "Solomon syndrome", and "Jadassohn's nevus phakomatosis". "Nevus" is sometimes spelled "naevus", and the Latin phrase "nevus sebaceus" may be used instead of "sebaceous nevus". "Epidermal nevus syndrome" is sometimes used as a synonym, but more often as a broader term referring to Schimmelpenning syndrome in addition to nevus comedonicus syndrome, CHILD syndrome, Becker's nevus syndrome, and phakomatosis pigmentokeratotica.

The classic Schimmelpenning syndrome diagnosis comprises a triad of sebaceous nevi, seizures, and mental retardation. The condition was first reported by Gustav Schimmelpenning in 1957 and independently reported by Feuerstein and Mims in 1962.

== Signs and symptoms ==
Since the original identification of Schimmelpenning syndrome, the number of findings has expanded to the point that the syndrome is associated with a considerable constellation of abnormalities. The abnormalities may occur in a variety of combinations, and need not include all three aspects of the classic triad of sebaceous nevus, seizures and mental retardation. In 1998, a literature review by van de Warrenburg et al. found:

- seizures in 67% of cases
- intellectual disability in 61% of cases
- ophthalmological abnormalities in 59% of cases
- involvement of other organ systems in 61% of cases
- structural abnormality of cerebrum or cranium in 72% of cases

The major neurological abnormalities include intellectual disability to varying extent, seizures, and hemiparesis. Seizures, when present, typically begin during the first year of life. The most common structural central nervous system abnormalities in Schimmelpenning syndrome are hemimegalencephaly and ipsilateral gyral malformations.

The major ocular abnormalities are colobomas and choristomas.

Skeletal abnormalities may include dental irregularities, scoliosis, vitamin D-resistant rickets and hypophosphatemia. Cardiovascular abnormalities include ventricular septal defect and coarctation of the aorta; urinary system issues include horseshoe kidney and duplicated urinary collection system.

== Genetic ==
Schimmelpenning syndrome appears to be sporadic rather than inherited, in almost all cases. It is thought to result from mosaicism for activating mutations in HRAS, KRAS, or NRAS genes. The mutation appears to arise after fertilization and therefore involves only a subset of cells. The earlier in embryological development such a mutation occurs, the more extensive the nevi are likely to be and the greater the likelihood of other organ system involvement.

== Management ==
In general, children with a small isolated nevus and a normal physical exam do not need further testing; treatment may include potential surgical removal of the nevus. If syndrome issues are suspected, neurological, ocular, and skeletal exams are important. Laboratory investigations may include serum and urine calcium and phosphate, and possibly liver and renal function tests. The choice of imaging studies depends on the suspected abnormalities and might include skeletal survey, CT scan of the head, MRI, and/or EEG.

Depending on the systems involved, an individual with Schimmelpenning syndrome may need to see an interdisciplinary team of specialists: dermatologist, neurologist, ophthalmologist, orthopedic surgeon, oral surgeon, plastic surgeon, psychologist.

== Incidence ==
Nevus sebaceous was first identified in 1895 by Jadassohn. Sebaceous nevi occur in 1 to 3 of 1000 births, with equal incidence by sex. There is no test to determine whether an individual born with a sebaceous nevus will go on to develop further symptoms of Schimmelpenning syndrome. It has been reported that up to 10% of individuals with epidermal nevi may develop additional syndrome symptoms, but that number appears to be inconsistent with the rarity of the syndrome and may be overstated. Prevalence is unknown, but Epidermal nevus syndrome is listed with the National Organization for Rare Disorders, which defines rare as affecting "fewer than 200,000 people in the United States."

== See also ==
- Epidermis
- Epidermal nevus syndrome
- Skin lesion
- List of cutaneous conditions
