= Porokeratotic eccrine ostial and dermal duct nevus =

- Other names: PEODDN
- Specialty: Dermatology

Porokeratotic eccrine ostial and dermal duct nevus (PEODDN) is a skin lesion that resembles a comedonal nevus, but it occurs on the palms and soles where pilosebaceous follicles are normally absent. It is probably transmitted by paradominant transmission.

== Signs and symptoms ==
PEODDN is defined by the characteristic presentation of numerous punctate or keratotic papules on the extremities that develop during infancy or at birth. While lesions are typically localized to the distal extremities, which are the most prevalent sites of occurrence, reports have also indicated broad involvement of the trunk, face, and proximal extremities. Plaques are frequently formed from the keratotic papules, and more advanced lesions typically disperse throughout Blaschko's lines. Although it is typically asymptomatic, moderate pruritus, hyperhidrosis, or anhidrosis may coexist with it.

== Causes ==
It is unknown what causes PEODDN. The hypothesized pathomechanism of the entity appears to be genetic mosaicism and a possible eccrine or restricted epidermal aberration of keratinization. Recent research suggests that PEODDN is a mosaic variant of keratitis ichthyosis deafness (KID) syndrome caused by a somatic mutation in GJB2, which encodes a gap junction protein called connexin-26.

PEODDN has been linked in a number of case reports to disorders such sensory polyneuropathy and hyperthyroidism, breast hypoplasia, Bowen disease, alopecia, hemiparesis, scoliosis, deafness and development delay, seizure disorder, and squamous cell carcinoma.

== Diagnosis ==
The foundation of diagnosis is histopathology; cornoid lamella with acrosyringia involved is pathognomonic for PEODDN. It is typically linked to eccrine duct dilatation. Differential diagnoses include inflammatory linear verrucous epidermal nevus, porokeratosis plantaris discreta, nevus comedonicus, linear psoriasis, linear epidermal nevus, spiny keratoderma, congenital unilateral punctate porokeratosis, linear porokeratosis, and porokeratosis of Mibelli.

== Treatment ==
There are few choices for treatment. With time, some lesions may spontaneously flatten. Surgery may be a good option for small, isolated lesions. Laser therapy is a great technique because there is very little risk of pigmentary alterations and scarring, especially when using an ultra-pulse CO2 laser. Patients with PEODDN have demonstrated considerable cosmetic improvement with combined erbium/CO2 laser therapy. Topical steroids, retinoids, phototherapy, electrocautery, keratolytics, and cryotherapy are examples of modalities that have not demonstrated any encouraging outcomes.

== See also ==
- Prominent inferior labial artery
- List of cutaneous conditions
