= Inflammatory linear verrucous epidermal nevus =

- Other names: ILVEN
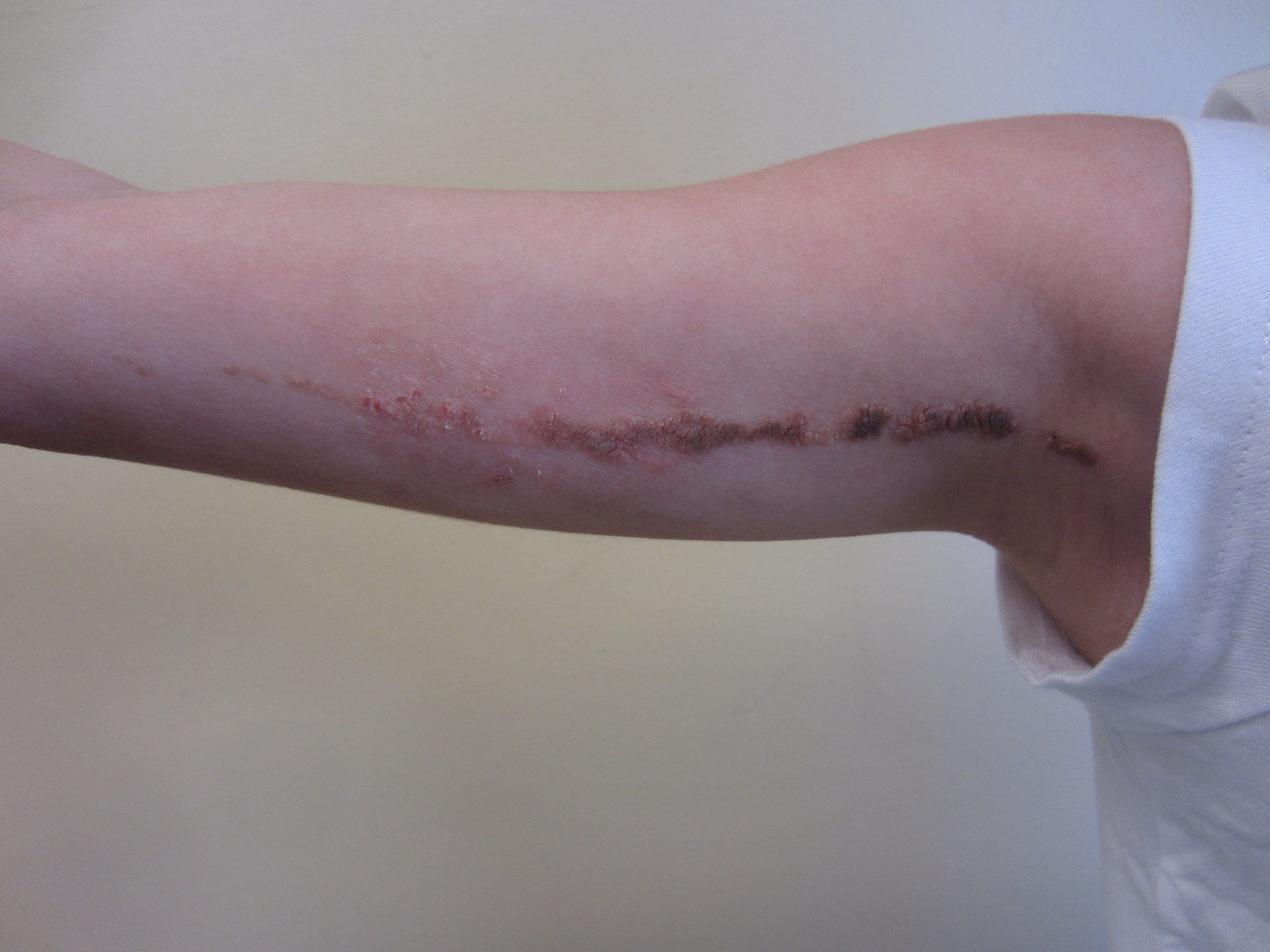
- Verrucous linear plaque following the lines of Blaschko over the right upper arm of a young girl
- Usual onset: LVEN usually presents in childhood, typically within the first 6 months of life. Rare onset in adulthood has also been reported
- Duration: Chronic
- Causes: Somatic mutations in keratinocyte precursor cells during embryogenesis
- Diagnostic method: Clinical findings, histopathological examination for confirmation
- Differential diagnosis: linear psoriasis, lichen striatus, linear porokeratosis, Incontinentia pigmenti
- Prevention: None
- Treatment: surgical removal, laser ablation, cryotherapy, skin grafts
- Medication: retinoids, corticosteroids or calcipotriol
- Prognosis: Rarely, can become cancerous if not removed (for example, basal cell carcinoma or squamous cell carcinoma)

Inflammatory linear verrucous epidermal nevus (ILVEN) is an uncommon skin (cutaneous) disorder characterized by itchy (pruritic), red (erythematous) and raised (hyperkeratotic) plaques that follow the lines of skin cell development (Blaschko lines). The rash typically presents in infancy or early childhood, with a female predominance and most frequently affects the lower limbs. ILVEN is caused by somatic mutations during the embryonic stage that results in visible genetic mosaicism. There is no cure, but different medical treatments can alleviate the symptoms.

The plaques can vary significantly, but tend to be slightly warty (psoriaform) or scaly (eczema-like).

== Mosaicism ==
Initially, ILVEN was regarded as a distinct disease, which was diagnosed by the "warty" appearance (psoriaform epidermal hyperplasia with orthokeratosis and parakeratosis), and the number of lymphocytes invading the tissue (perivascular lymphocytic infiltrate), as well as the tendency of these plaques to roughly follow lines on the skin.

However, it is now recognized that the disease arises from a collection of different molecular mechanisms, but look similarly with overlapping clinical features.

== Appearance ==
ILVEN typically affects one side of the body (unilateral) which is usually the left side of patients is affected. The condition is persistent and forms along characteristic lines. It usually appears on an extremity in infancy or childhood. Altman and Mehregan described six characteristic features of ILVEN: (1) early age of onset, (2) predominance in females (4:1 female-male ratio), (3) frequent involvement of the left leg, (4) pruritus, or "itchiness" (5) marked refractoriness to therapy, and (6) a distinctive psoriasiform and inflammatory histologic appearance.

== Genetics ==
ILVEN is increasingly understood as a mosaic inflammatory disorder caused by post-zygotic (somatic) mutations in keratinocyte-related genes.

Recent genomic reports have implicated mutations in genes including GJA1 (connexin 43) and CARD14 among others; however, the genetic landscape is heterogeneous and research is evolving.

The molecular findings help explain phenotypic overlap with other inflammatory disorders.

Most cases are sporadic, but a familial cases do exist, with the condition occurring in a mother and her daughter. Another case was described in a father and son.

It also has been proposed that activation of an autosomal dominant lethal mutation that survives by mosaicism may be the cause of the lesions. The mutated cells may survive in the due to proximity of normal cells. Another theory is that retrotransposable elements may be the cause of all skin conditions along the Lines of Blashko. Some dogs have a coat variation based upon a similar mechanism.

=== Associated Mutations ===
- ABCA12 mutation causes a lamellar granule dysfunction and lipid barrier defect which in turn causes a linear ichthyosiform ILVEN-like plaques
- CARD14 mutation activates the NF-κB and IL-12/IL-23/IL-17 pathway that causes a psoriaform ILVEN
- GJA1 (also known as Connexin 43) mutation causes a type of gap junction dysfunction also known to cause erythrokeratodermia variabilis et progressiva
- HRAS the mutation that involved in ILVEN is a RAS-MAPK pathway hyperactivation (RASopathy-related).
- KRT10 mutation causes keratinocyte differentiation abnormality causes systematized ILVEN with hyperkeratosis
- NSDHL mutation disrupts cholesterol biosynthesis in a manner similar to CHILD syndrome, but in Blaschko-linear plaques
- PMVK mutation causes impaired mevalonate pathway with second-hit mosaicism causes ILVEN-like linear porokeratosis with cornoid lamellae

== Histopathology ==
-The plaques are characterized histologically by hyperkeratosis which is a thickening of the outer layer of skin. Hyperkeratosis is often associated with an abnormal amount of keratin production. Also characteristic is moderate acanthosis a thickening of the stratum spinosum with elongation of rete ridges.

- Characteristic histologic feature is regular alternation of slightly raised parakeratotic areas without a granular layer (hypogranulosis) and slightly depressed orthokeratotic areas with prominent granular layer (hypergranulosis). Orthokeratotic hyperkeratosis is characterised by hyperkeratosis with non-nucleated cells. Parakeratotic hyperkeratosis is characterised by hyperkeratosis with nucleated cells.

- The orthokeratotic area shows a basket-weave-pattern.

- The dermis shows scattering of chronic inflammatory infiltrate (Munro's microabscess) sometimes giving a spongiform appearance.

This is very similar to linear psoriasis, but it has been noted that the diseases are distinct entities by immunohistochemical analyses.

== Immunohistochemistry ==
Patients with ILVEN with and without associated psoriasis, the number of Ki-67 positive nuclei, tended to be lower than is typically found in psoriasis. Additionally, the number of keratin-10 positive cells and HLA-DR expression was higher as compared to psoriasis. In ILVEN without associated psoriasis all T-cell subsets and cells expressing NK receptors were reduced as compared to psoriasis, except for CD45RA+ cells. In particular the density of CD8+, CD45RO+ and CD2+, CD94 and CD161 showed a marked difference between ILVEN without psoriasis and psoriasis itself. T cells relevant in the pathogenesis of psoriasis are markedly reduced in ILVEN without psoriasis as compared to psoriasis.

== Treatment ==
Reported treatments include topical agents, dermabrasion, cryotherapy, laser therapy, and surgical excision. These therapies have a high failure rate because of incomplete relief of symptoms, scarring, or recurrence.

Though similar in appearance, ILVEN will not respond to therapies known to affect psoriasis. ILVEN can be very difficult to live with but can be treated. The most effective method is full-thickness excision of the lesion. CO_{2} laser surgery can resurface the skin to give a flat, smoother and more normal appearance, but does not remove the lesion.

== History ==
The condition later known as ILVEN was first described by Paul Gerson Unna in 1896. ILVEN appears very similar to psoriasis. However, it was not until 1971 that the disorder was described and clearly defined as a distinct entity by Altman and Mehregan in a case study of 25 patients. The Dupre and Christol described histopathological criteria in 1977.

== Prognosis and complications ==
ILVEN is benign but chronic as the lesions usually persist long-term.

Pruritus can be severe and impair quality of life.

Rarely, ILVEN can be part of an epidermal nevus syndrome with extracutaneous abnormalities (skeletal, neurologic, ocular). Such associations are uncommon but reported and warrant assessment when lesions are extensive or accompanied by developmental findings.

Malignant transformation is rare in young children, but there are isolated case reports of adnexal tumors or other neoplasms arising in longstanding epidermal nevi. Vigilance for new changes (ulceration, rapid growth) is prudent.

== See also ==
- Linear verrucous epidermal nevus
- List of cutaneous conditions
