= Lichenoid eruption =

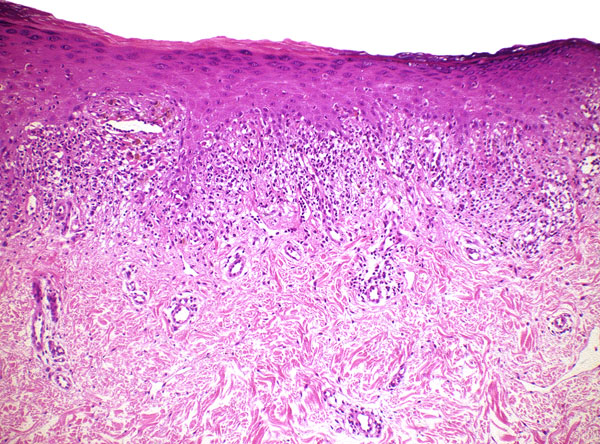
- Histopathology of lichenoid drug reaction. It resembles lichen planus because of irregular epithelial hyperplasia, focal hypergranulosis, orthokeratosis, and a “saw-tooth” pattern of rete ridges.
- Specialty: Dermatology

A lichenoid eruption is a skin disease characterized by damage and infiltration between the epidermis and dermis.

Examples include lichen planus, lichen sclerosus and lichen nitidus. It can also be associated with abrasion or drug use. It has been observed in conjunction with the use of proton pump inhibitors, and might be a sign and/or symptom of lupus such as subacute cutaneous lupus erythematous, according to the case reports and reviews.

The term "lichenoid" derives from a resemblance to a lichen.
