= Pigmented hairy epidermal nevus syndrome =

Medical condition

- Other names: Becker's naevus syndrome
- Specialty: Dermatology

Pigmented hairy epidermal nevus syndrome, also known as Becker's naevus syndrome, is a cutaneous condition characterized by a Becker nevus, ipsilateral hypoplasia of the breast, and skeletal defects such as scoliosis.

== Signs and symptoms ==
Pigmented hairy epidermal nevus syndrome is defined by the presence of a hypoplastic defect of the muscle, skin, or skeleton, or by ipsilateral breast hypoplasia associated with a Becker's nevus.

Anomalies of the skin such as granuloma annulare, basal cell carcinoma, melanoma, lymphangioma, osteoma cutis, and hypohidrosis have been observed to co-localize with Becker's nevus. There have also been reports of quadriparesis, congenital adrenal hyperplasia, pectus carinatum, spina bifida, and an accessory scrotum.

There have been several reports of ipsilateral developmental anomalies, including lipoatrophy, segmental odontomaxillary dysplasia, limb reduction, aplasia of the pectoralis major muscle, breast hypoplasia, and supernumerary nipples.

== Diagnosis ==
The majority of the diagnosis is clinical, with a well-defined area of hyperpigmentation and hypoplasia of the ipsilateral breast, areola and/or nipple, limb, muscle, and adipose tissue. Histology results showing high androgen receptor levels in the hypoplastic muscles similar to those expressed in the genitalia further corroborate the diagnosis.

== See also ==
- Epidermal nevus syndrome
- List of cutaneous conditions
