= Rombo =

Rombo may refer to:

== People ==
- Edward Rombo, Kenyan rugby player
- Elin Rombo (born 1976), Swedish operatic soprano

== Places ==
- Rombo Division, Kenya
- Rombo District, Tanzania
- Ilhéus do Rombo
- Passo del Rombo mountain pass, also known as Timmelsjoch

== Other ==
- Rombo language, spoken in Tanzania
- Rombo syndrome
- Rombo shrew, also known as Kilimanjaro shrew
- Rhombus, in Spanish, Italian, Portuguese and Esperanto
