= Zosteriform speckled lentiginous nevus =

Type of skin condition

- Specialty: Dermatology

Zosteriform speckled lentiginous nevus is a birthmark, a type of nevus spilus that runs along the path of a nerve supply. It may be the result of a potentially lethal mutation.

The terminology has been described as "confusing".

It was characterized in 1981.

Cutaneous findings in FACES syndrome include zosteriform speckled lentiginous nevi.

== See also ==
- McCune–Albright syndrome
- List of cutaneous conditions
