= List of cutaneous conditions associated with increased risk of nonmelanoma skin cancer =

There are several conditions of or affecting the human integumentary system that are associated with an increased risk of developing nonmelanoma skin cancer (i.e. squamous-cell carcinoma and basal-cell carcinoma).

Conditions of or affecting the human integumentary system associated with increased risk of nonmelanoma skin cancer
Condition	Squamous-cell carcinoma	Basal-cell carcinoma
Xeroderma pigmentosum	+	+
Oculocutaneous albinism	+	+
Epidermodysplasia verruciformis	+	
Recessive dystrophic epidermolysis bullosa	+	
Ferguson–Smith syndrome	+	
Muir–Torre syndrome	+	+
Nevoid basal cell carcinoma syndrome		+
Bazex syndrome		+
Rombo syndrome		+
Discoid lupus erythematosus	+	
Erosive lichen planus	+	
Lichen sclerosus	+	
Porokeratosis	+	
Nevus sebaceous (Note: The most common benign neoplasm that may develop within a nevus sebaceous is a syringocystadenoma papilliferum, and the second most common is a trichoblastoma. The most common malignant neoplasm is a basal cell carcinoma.)		+
Chronic non-healing wounds	+	
Seborrheic keratosis		+

== See also ==
- List of cutaneous conditions
- List of contact allergens
- List of cutaneous conditions associated with internal malignancy
- List of cutaneous conditions caused by mutations in keratins
- List of cutaneous conditions caused by problems with junctional proteins
- List of genes mutated in cutaneous conditions
- List of histologic stains that aid in diagnosis of cutaneous conditions
- List of immunofluorescence findings for autoimmune bullous conditions
- List of inclusion bodies that aid in diagnosis of cutaneous conditions
- List of keratins expressed in the human integumentary system
- List of specialized glands within the human integumentary system
- List of target antigens in pemphigoid
- List of target antigens in pemphigus
