= Phakomatosis pigmentovascularis =

- Other names: Association of cutaneous vascular malformations and different pigmentary disorders
- Specialty: Dermatology

Phakomatosis pigmentovascularis is a rare neurocutanous condition where there is coexistence of a capillary malformation (port-wine stain) with various melanocytic lesions, including dermal melanocytosis (Mongolian spots), nevus spilus, and nevus of Ota.

== Types ==
Phakomatosis pigmentovascularis is subdivided into five types:

- Type 1 PWS + epidermal nevus
- Type 2 (most common): PWS + dermal melanocytosis +/- nevus anemicus
- Type 3: PWS + nevus spilus +/- nevus anemicus
- Type 4: PWS + nevus spilus + dermal melanocytosis +/- nevus anemicus
- Type 5: CMTC (Cutis marmorata telangiectatica congenita) + dermal melanocytosis

They all can contain capillary malformation. Type 2 is the most common and can be associated with granular cell tumor. Some further subdivide each type into categories A & B; with A representing oculocutaneous involvement and subtype B representing extra oculocutaneous involvement. Others have proposed fewer subtypes but currently this rare entity is mostly taught as having five subtypes currently.

== See also ==
- List of cutaneous conditions
