= Rombo syndrome =

- Other names: Vermiculate atrophoderma, milia, hypotrichosis, trichoepitheliomas, basal cell carcinomas and peripheral vasodilation with cyanosis
- Rombo syndrome is inherited in an autosomal dominant manner

Rombo syndrome is a very rare genetic disorder characterized mainly by atrophoderma vermiculatum of the face, multiple milia, telangiectases, acral erythema, peripheral vasodilation with cyanosis, and a propensity to develop basal cell carcinomas.

The lesions become visible in late childhood, began at ages 7 to 10 years and are most pronounced on the face. At that time a pronounced, somewhat cyanotic redness of the lips and hands was evident as well as moderate follicular atrophy of the skin on the cheeks. In adulthood, whitish-yellow, milia-like papules and telangiectatic vessels developed. The papules were present particularly on the cheeks and forehead, gradually becoming very conspicuous and dominating the clinical picture. Trichoepitheliomas were found in 1 case.

In adults, the eyelashes and eyebrows were either missing or irregularly distributed with defective and maldirected growth. Basal cell carcinomas were a frequent complication. The skin atrophy was referred to as vermiculate atrophoderma. Basal cell carcinomas may develop around the age of 35. Histological observations during the early stage include irregularly distributed and atrophic hair follicles, milia, dilated dermal vessels, lack of elastin or elastin in clumps. After light irradiation a tendency to increased repair activity was observed both in epidermis and in the dermal fibroblasts. Histologic sections showed the dermis to be almost devoid of elastin in most areas with clumping of elastic material in other areas. The disorder had been transmitted through at least 4 generations with instances of male-to-male transmission.

== See also ==
- Tricho–rhino–phalangeal syndrome
- List of cutaneous conditions
- List of cutaneous conditions associated with increased risk of nonmelanoma skin cancer
- List of cutaneous neoplasms associated with systemic syndromes
