= Systematized epidermal nevus =

- Specialty: Dermatology

Systematized epidermal nevus is a cutaneous condition, an epidermal nevus with a diffuse or extensive distribution involving a large portion of a person's body surface.

== See also ==
- Linear verrucous epidermal nevus
