= Nevus unius lateris =

- Specialty: Dermatology

Nevus unius lateris is a cutaneous condition, an epidermal nevus in which the skin lesions are distributed on one-half of the body.

== See also ==
- Linear verrucous epidermal nevus
