= Trichoblastoma =

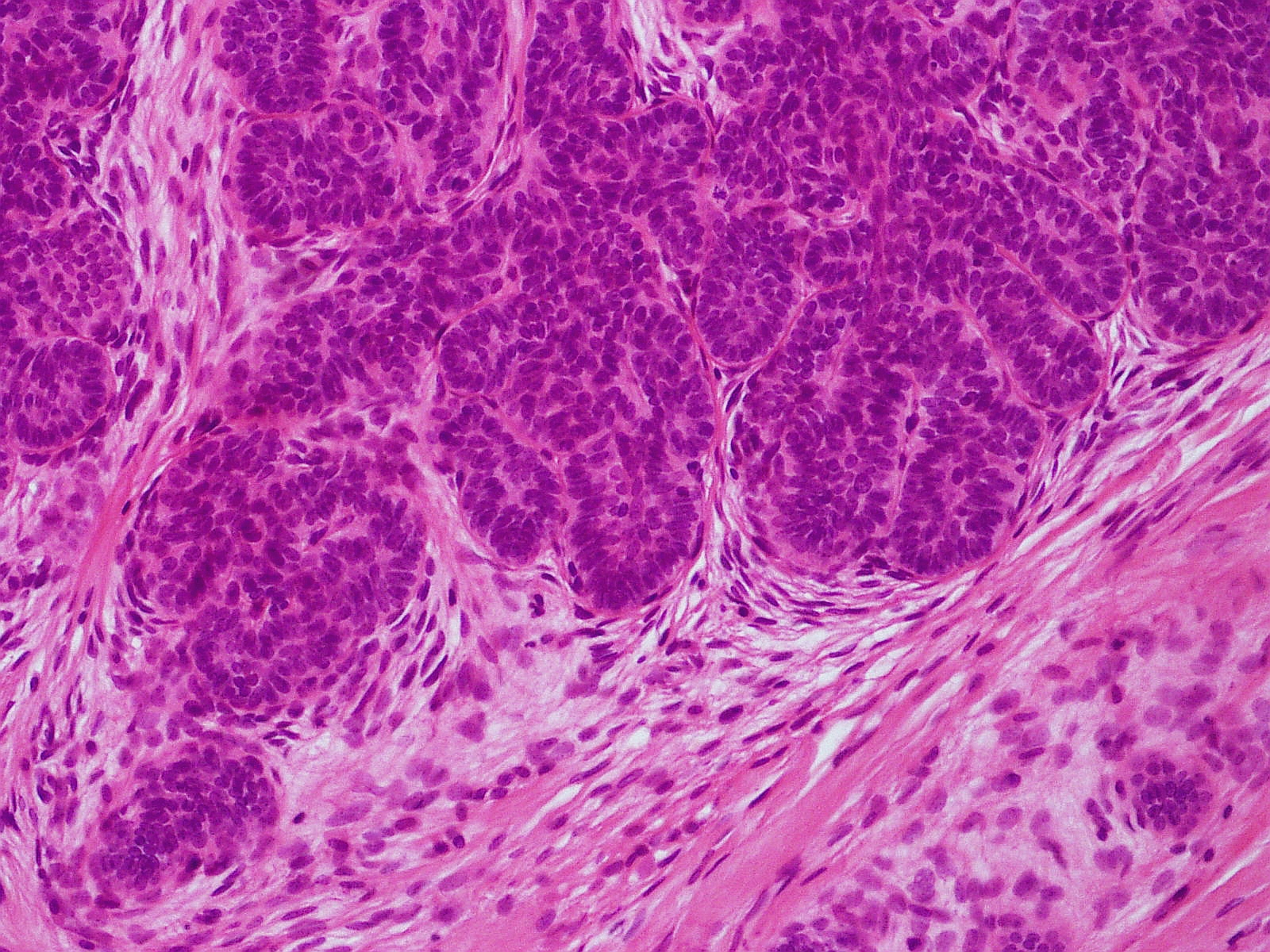
- Specialty: Oncology, dermatology

Trichoblastomas are a skin condition characterized by benign neoplasms of the follicular germinative cells known as trichoblasts.

Trichoblastic fibroma is a term used to describe small nodular trichoblastomas that contain a conspicuous fibrocytic component, sometimes constituting over 50% of the lesion.

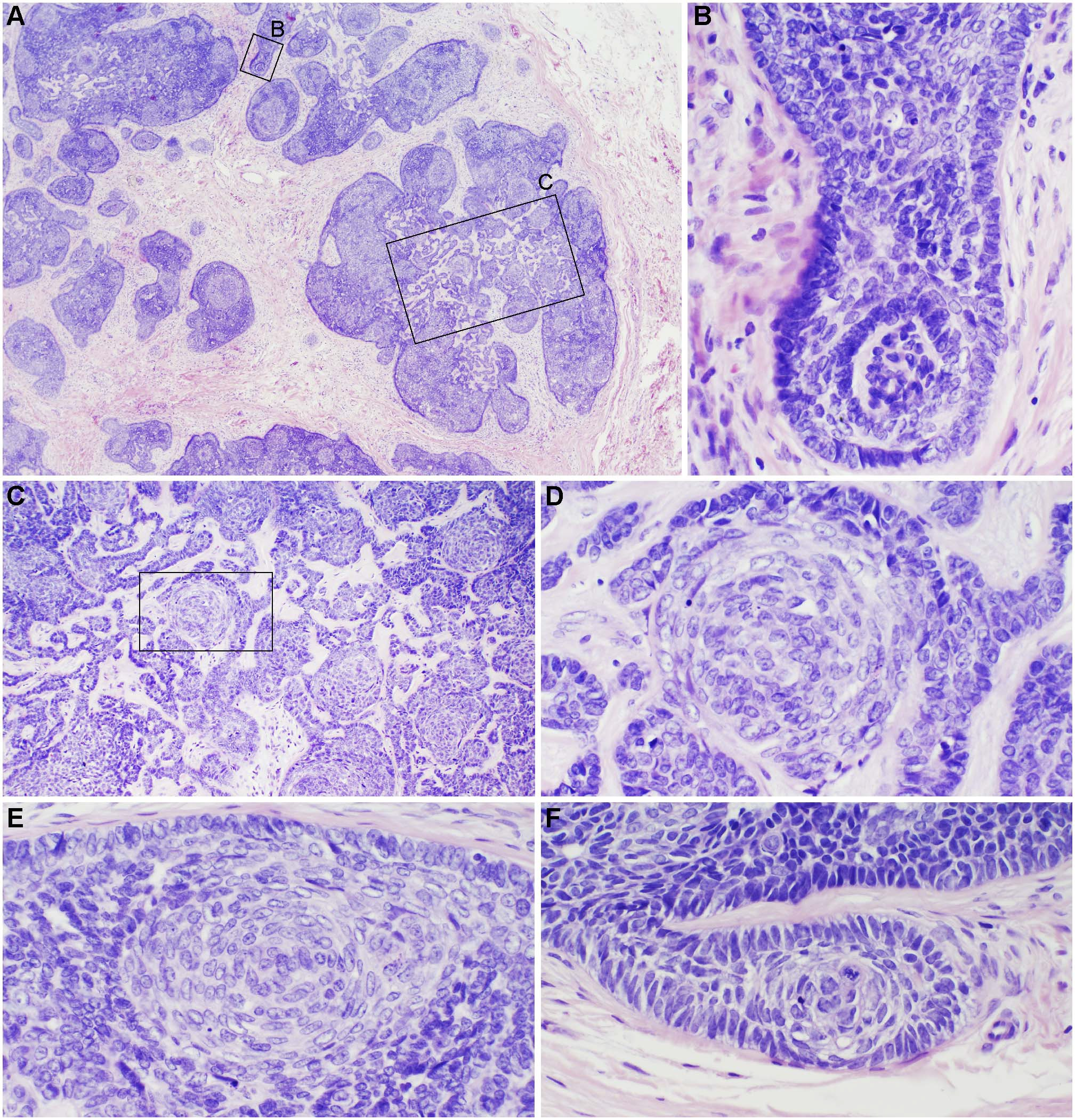

Image at left shows a trichoblastoma from a 68-year-old Caucasian male. It shows a pseudo-encapsulated, multinodular, basaloid tumor with fibrocellular stroma spanning the reticular dermis extending into subcutaneous fat (A). No epidermal connection or retraction artifact was noted. Tumor lobules were arranged as monomorphous basaloid cells in a cribriform pattern with peripheral palisading some resembling abortive hair follicles (B, F). Focally, tumor lobules exhibited squamous eddies, papillary mesenchymal bodies, and a germinative component comprising basaloid cells admixed with distinct pales cells (Zellballen) (C–E, D is an enlargement of boxed area in C).

== See also ==
- Trichoepithelioma
- Basal cell carcinoma § Pathophysiology (trichoblastic carcinoma is a rare malignant lesion that can sometimes resemble trichoblastoma)
- Skin lesion
- List of cutaneous conditions
- List of cutaneous conditions associated with increased risk of nonmelanoma skin cancer
