= Nevus spilus =

- Other names: Speckled lentiginous nevus
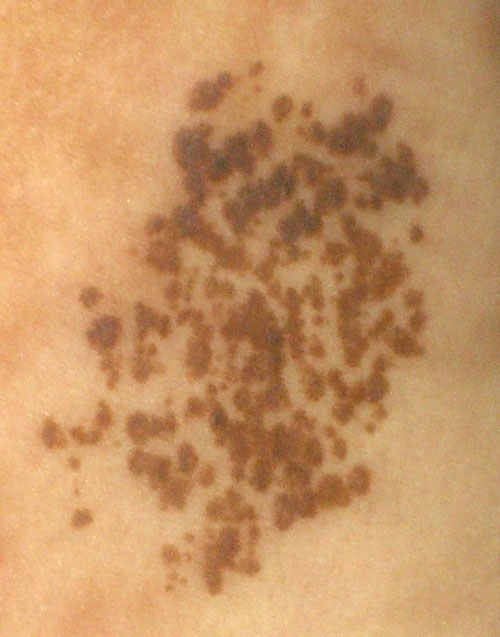
- Nevus spilus, approximately 3 cm x 4 cm
- Specialty: Dermatology

Nevus spilus, also known as speckled lentiginous nevus, is a light brown or tan birth mark, speckled with small, dark spots or small bumps. If it occurs in a segmental pattern then it is sometimes referred to as a Zosteriform speckled lentiginous nevus.

It may be associated with types of phakomatosis pigmentovascularis.

Prevalence is between 0.2% and 2.8%.

== See also ==
- Phakomatosis pigmentokeratotica
- Skin lesion
- List of cutaneous conditions
