= Epidermal nevus syndrome =

- Other names: Solomon's syndrome, Feuerstein and Mims syndrome
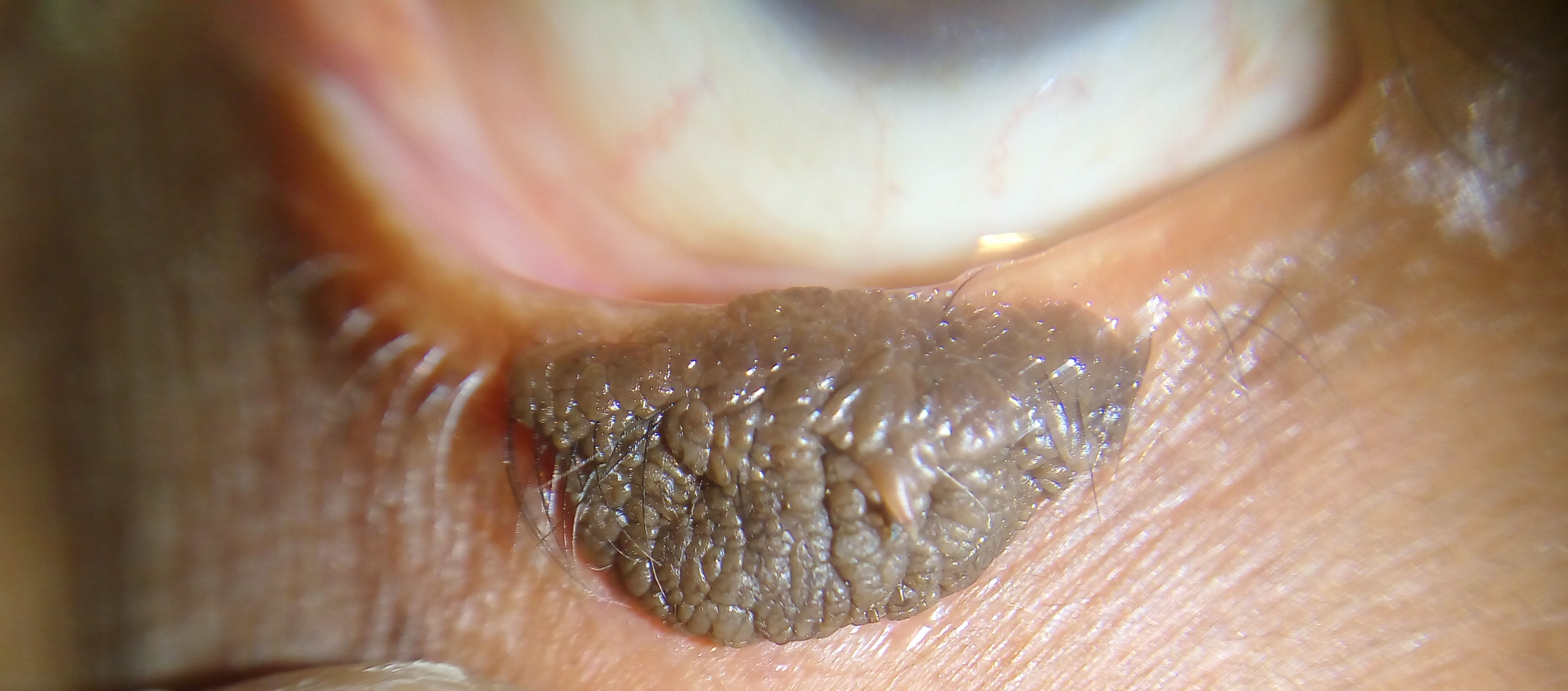
- Epidermal nevus in lower eyelid margin
- Specialty: Dermatology, medical genetics

Epidermal nevus syndrome, also known as Feuerstein and Mims syndrome, and Solomon's syndrome is a rare disease that was first described in 1968 and consists of extensive epidermal nevi with abnormalities of the central nervous system (CNS), skeleton, skin, cardiovascular system, genitourinary system and eyes. However, since the syndrome's first description, a broader concept for the "epidermal nevus" syndrome has been proposed, with at least six types being described:

- Schimmelpenning syndrome
- Nevus comedonicus syndrome
- Pigmented hairy epidermal nevus syndrome
- Proteus syndrome
- CHILD syndrome
- Phakomatosis pigmentokeratotica

== Treatment ==
There is no known cure for Epidermal nevus syndrome, and treatment focuses on managing specific symptoms. Specialists like neurologists, dermatologists, and orthopedists work together to coordinate care. Skin lesions are treated directly with topical medications or surgery.

== See also ==
- Epidermis
- List of cutaneous conditions
