= Phakomatosis pigmentokeratotica =

- Other names: Organoid nevus with sebaceous differentiation, a speckled-lentiginous nevus, and other associated anomalies
- Specialty: Dermatology

Phakomatosis pigmentokeratotica is a rare neurocutaneous condition characterized by the combination of an organoid sebaceous nevus and speckled lentiginous nevus. It is an unusual variant of epidermal naevus syndrome. It was first described by Happle et al. It is often associated with neurological or skeletal anomalies such as hemiatrophy, dysaesthesia and hyperhidrosis in a segmental pattern, mild mental retardation, seizures, deafness, ptosis and strabismus.

== Signs and symptoms ==
Phakomatosis pigmentokeratotica consists of a speckled lentiginous naevus arranged in a checkerboard pattern and an organoid (epidermal) naevus associated with sebaceous differentiation. Other abnormalities are prevalent; these are usually neurological or skeletal and include hemiatrophy, segmental dysaesthesia and hyperhidrosis, mild intellectual disability, seizures, deafness, ptosis, and strabismus.

== Causes ==
Phakomatosis pigmentokeratotica is brought on by a multipotent progenitor cell's postzygotic HRAS mutation.

== See also ==
- Skin lesion
- List of cutaneous conditions associated with increased risk of nonmelanoma skin cancer
