= Disseminated superficial actinic porokeratosis =

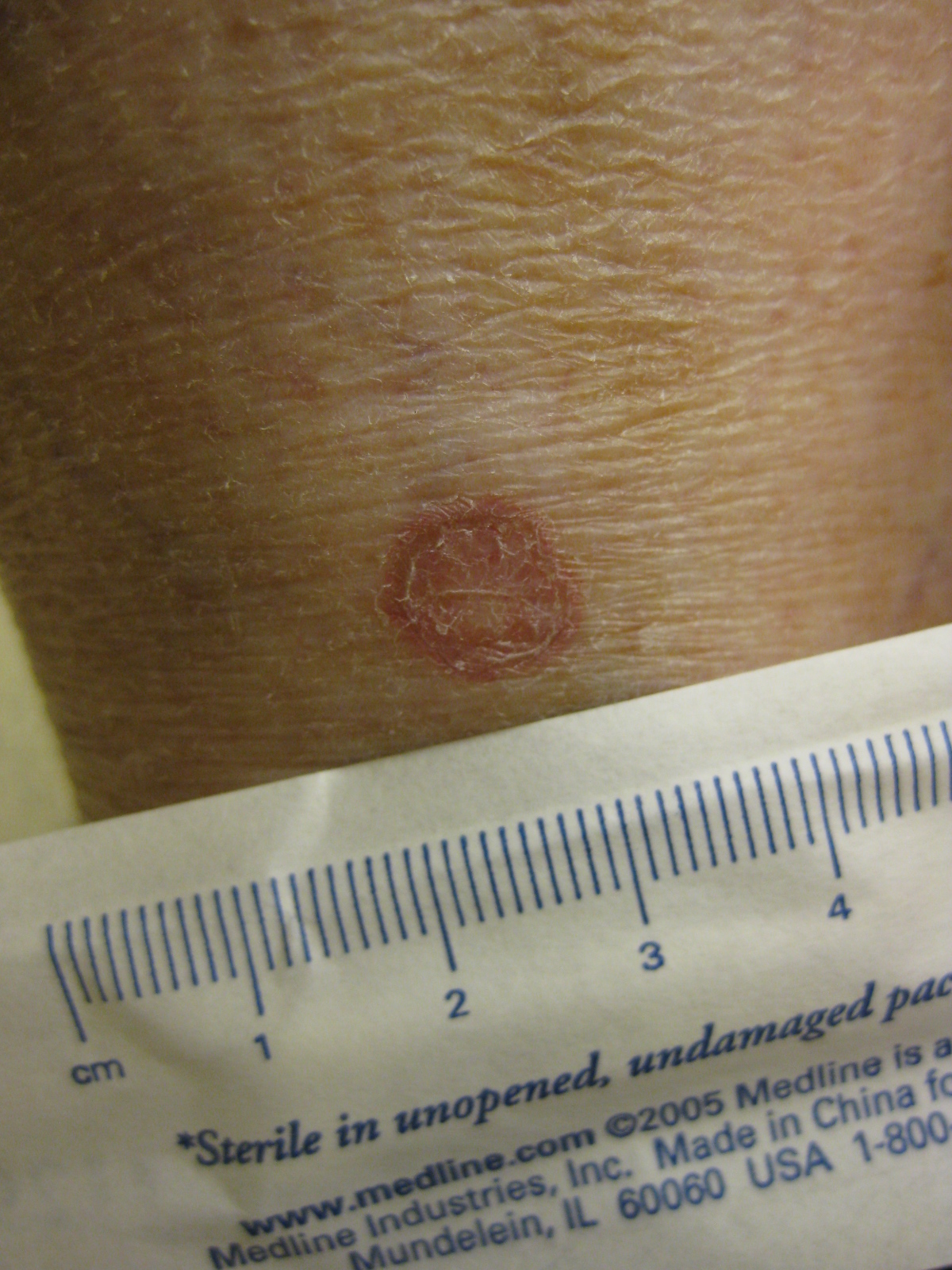
- A porokeratosis lesion in a patient with disseminated superficial actinic porokeratosis.
- Specialty: Dermatology

Disseminated superficial actinic porokeratosis (DSAP) is a non-contagious skin condition with apparent genetic origin in the SART3 gene. It most often presents in sun-exposed areas of the body. Some DSAP cases have been reported in patients with acute immune compromised situations, particularly in the elderly. For those with sun damaged skin, the lesions usually begin to appear in the patient's 20s and increase in number and visibility in the 40s or 50s. Commonly, though not always, the number and visibility of lesions is in direct proportion to the amount of sun damage to the affected area.

Lesions generally are characterized by an irregularly shaped thread-like ring that is usually the size of a pencil eraser, though lesions vary and may be half or double that size. The thread-like ring is very thin, much like fabric thread for sewing, and raised such that it is both palpable and visible. The interior of the ring may be rough like sandpaper, or smooth. The interior is often discolored, though colors vary from patient to patient. Lesions, due to their vascular nature, can also vary according to body temperature, environmental temperatures, and other external stimuli. The internal ring color is most often reddish, purplish, pink, or brown.

Some patients report itching and irritation associated with the condition, and many report no notable sensation. Although no known hormonal link has been found, DSAP occurs more commonly in women.

A study in 2000 was done on a Chinese family, in which a locus for a gene was located.

== See also ==
- Porokeratosis
- Skin lesion
- List of cutaneous conditions
