= Becker's nevus =

Irregularly pigmented area of skin with hair growth

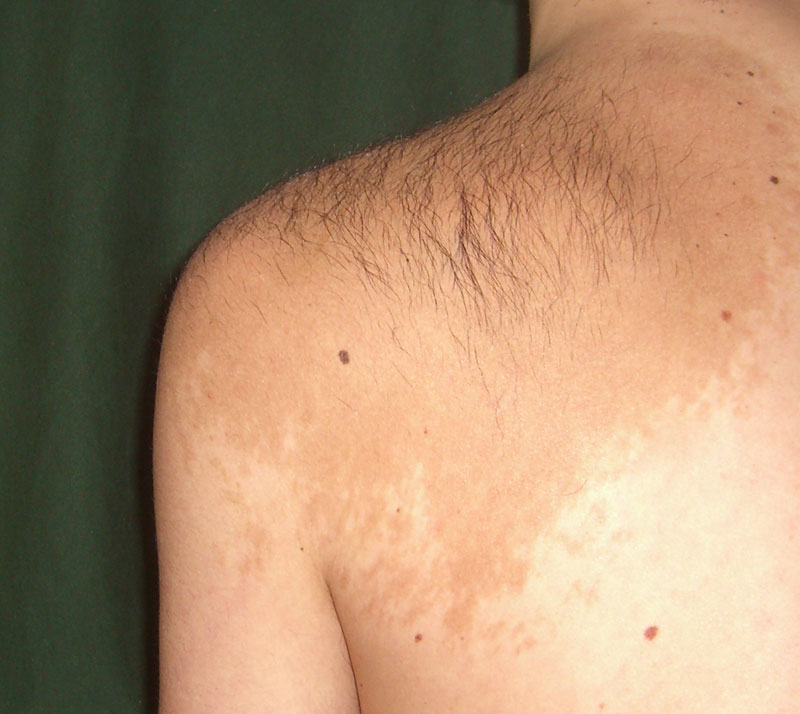
- Becker's nevus on the left shoulder
- Specialty: Unknown

Becker's nevus (also known as "Becker's melanosis", "Becker's pigmentary hamartoma", "nevoid melanosis", and "pigmented hairy epidermal nevus") is a benign skin disorder predominantly affecting males. The nevus can be present at birth, but more often shows up around puberty. It generally first appears as an irregular pigmentation (melanosis or hyperpigmentation) on the torso or upper arm (though other areas of the body can be affected), and gradually enlarges irregularly, becoming thickened and often hairy (hypertrichosis). The nevus is due to an overgrowth of the epidermis, pigment cells (melanocytes), and hair follicles. This form of nevus was first documented in 1948 by American dermatologist Samuel William Becker (1894–1964).

== Clinical information ==
Medical knowledge and documentation of this disorder is poor, likely due to a combination of factors including recent discovery, low prevalence, and the more or less aesthetic nature of the effects of the skin disorder. Thus the pathophysiology of Becker's nevus remains unclear. While it is generally considered an acquired rather than congenital disorder, there exists at least one case report documenting what researchers claim is a congenital Becker's nevus with genetic association: a 16-month-old boy with a hyperpigmented lesion on his right shoulder whose father has a similar lesion on his right shoulder.

== Prevalence ==
The most extensive study to date, a 1981 survey of nearly 20,000 French males aged 17 to 26, served to disprove many commonly held beliefs about the disorder. In the French study, 100 subjects were found to have Becker's nevi, revealing a prevalence of 0.52%. Nevi appeared in one half the subjects before the age of 10, and between ages 10 and 20 in the rest. In one quarter of cases sun exposure seems to have played a role, a number apparently lower than that expected by researchers. Also surprising to researchers was the low incidence (32%) of Becker's nevi above the nipples, for it had generally been believed that the upper chest and shoulder area was the predominant site of occurrence. Pigmentation was light brown in 75% of cases (note: subjects were Caucasian), and average size of the nevus was 125 cm^{2} (19 in^{2}).

== Malignancy ==
A 1991 report documented the cases of nine patients with both Becker's nevus and melanoma. Of the nine melanomas, five were in the same body area as the Becker's nevus, with only one occurring within the nevus itself. As this was apparently the first documented co-occurrence of the two diseases, there is so far no evidence of higher malignancy rates in Becker's nevi versus normal skin. Nonetheless, as with any abnormal skin growth, the nevus should be monitored regularly and any sudden changes in appearance brought to the attention of one's doctor.

== Treatment ==
As Becker's nevus is considered a benign lesion, treatment is generally not necessary except for cosmetic purposes. Shaving or trimming can be effective in removing unwanted hair, while electrology or laser hair removal may offer a longer-lasting solution. Different types of laser treatments may also be effective in elimination or reduction of hyperpigmentation, though the results of laser treatments for both hair and pigment reduction appear to be highly variable.

== See also ==
- List of cutaneous conditions
