= NSDHL =

Protein-coding gene in the species Homo sapiens

Identifiers
- Aliases: NSDHL, H105E3, SDR31E1, XAP104, NAD(P) dependent steroid dehydrogenase-like
- External IDs: OMIM: 300275; MGI: 1099438; GeneCards: NSDHL
Enzyme activity
EC #	BRENDA	ExPASy	KEGG	MetaCyc
1.1.1.170	↗	↗	↗	↗

Gene location (Human)
Chr.	X chromosome (human)
Band	Xq28	Start	152,830,967 bp
Band	Xq28	End	152,869,729 bp

Gene location (Mouse)
Chr.	X chromosome (mouse)
Band	X A7.3|X 37.29 cM	Start	71,962,163 bp
Band	X A7.3|X 37.29 cM	End	72,002,120 bp
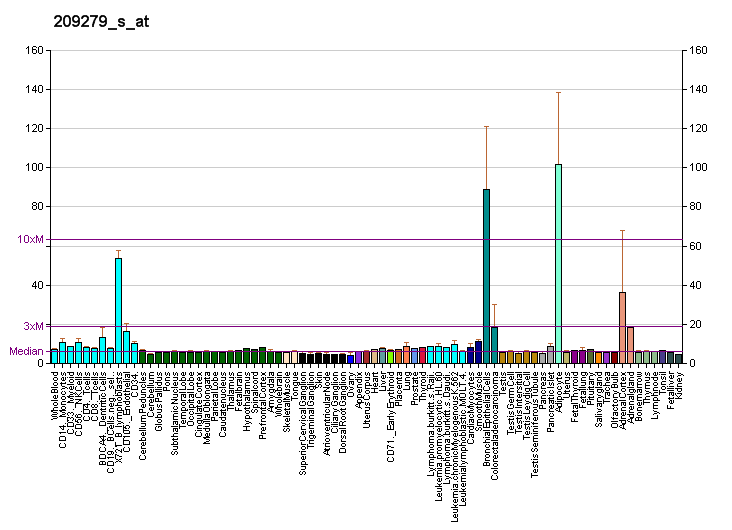

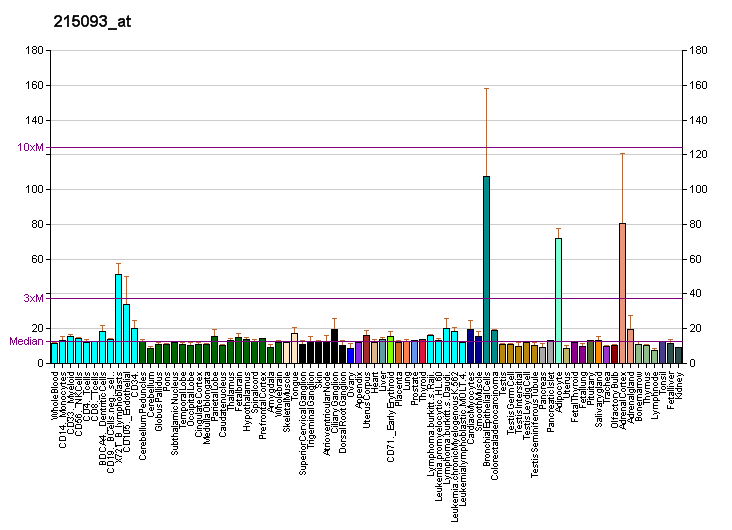
RNA expression pattern
Bgee	Human / Mouse (ortholog); Top expressed in: mucosa of esophagus; endothelial cell; gingival epithelium; right adrenal cortex; left adrenal gland; left adrenal cortex; mucosa of transverse colon; ganglionic eminence; gonad; right lobe of liver / Top expressed in: left lobe of liver; efferent ductule; superior cervical ganglion; medial vestibular nucleus; transitional epithelium of urinary bladder; brown adipose tissue; dorsal tegmental nucleus; anterior horn of spinal cord; facial motor nucleus; endothelial cell of lymphatic vessel; More reference expression data
BioGPS	More reference expression data
Gene ontology
Molecular function	3-beta-hydroxy-delta5-steroid dehydrogenase activity; oxidoreductase activity, acting on the CH-OH group of donors, NAD or NADP as acceptor; sterol-4-alpha-carboxylate 3-dehydrogenase (decarboxylating) activity; oxidoreductase activity; C-3 sterol dehydrogenase (C-4 sterol decarboxylase) activity; 4alpha-carboxy-4beta-methyl-5alpha-cholesta-8-en-3beta-ol:NAD(P)+ 3-oxidoreductase (decarboxylating) activity; 4alpha-carboxy-5alpha-cholesta-8-en-3beta-ol:NAD(P)+ 3-dehydrogenase (decarboxylating) activity
Cellular component	integral component of membrane; endoplasmic reticulum membrane; lipid droplet; membrane; endoplasmic reticulum
Biological process	lipid metabolism; labyrinthine layer blood vessel development; smoothened signaling pathway; steroid metabolic process; hair follicle development; cholesterol metabolic process; cholesterol biosynthetic process; steroid biosynthetic process; sterol biosynthetic process
Sources:Amigo / QuickGO
Orthologs
Databases	NCBI: entry; OMA: entry
Species	Human	Mouse
Entrez	50814	18194
Ensembl	ENSG00000147383	ENSMUSG00000031349
UniProt	Q15738	Q9R1J0
RefSeq (mRNA)	NM_001129765; NM_015922	NM_010941
RefSeq (protein)	NP_001123237; NP_057006	NP_035071
Location (UCSC)	Chr X: 152.83 – 152.87 Mb	Chr X: 71.96 – 72 Mb
PubMed search
- Wikidata
View/Edit Human	View/Edit Mouse

Sterol-4-alpha-carboxylate 3-dehydrogenase, decarboxylating is an enzyme that in humans is encoded by the NSDHL gene. This enzyme is localized in the endoplasmic reticulum and is involved in cholesterol biosynthesis.

== Clinical significance ==
Mutations in the NSDHL gene are associated with CHILD syndrome which is a X-linked dominant disorder of lipid metabolism with disturbed cholesterol biosynthesis, and typically lethal in males.
