= Nevus comedonicus syndrome =

- Specialty: Dermatology

Nevus comedonicus syndrome is a skin condition characterized by a nevus comedonicus associated with cataracts, scoliosis, and neurologic abnormalities.

== See also ==
- Epidermal nevus syndrome
- Cutaneous conditions
