= Nevus sebaceous =

Nevus sebaceus
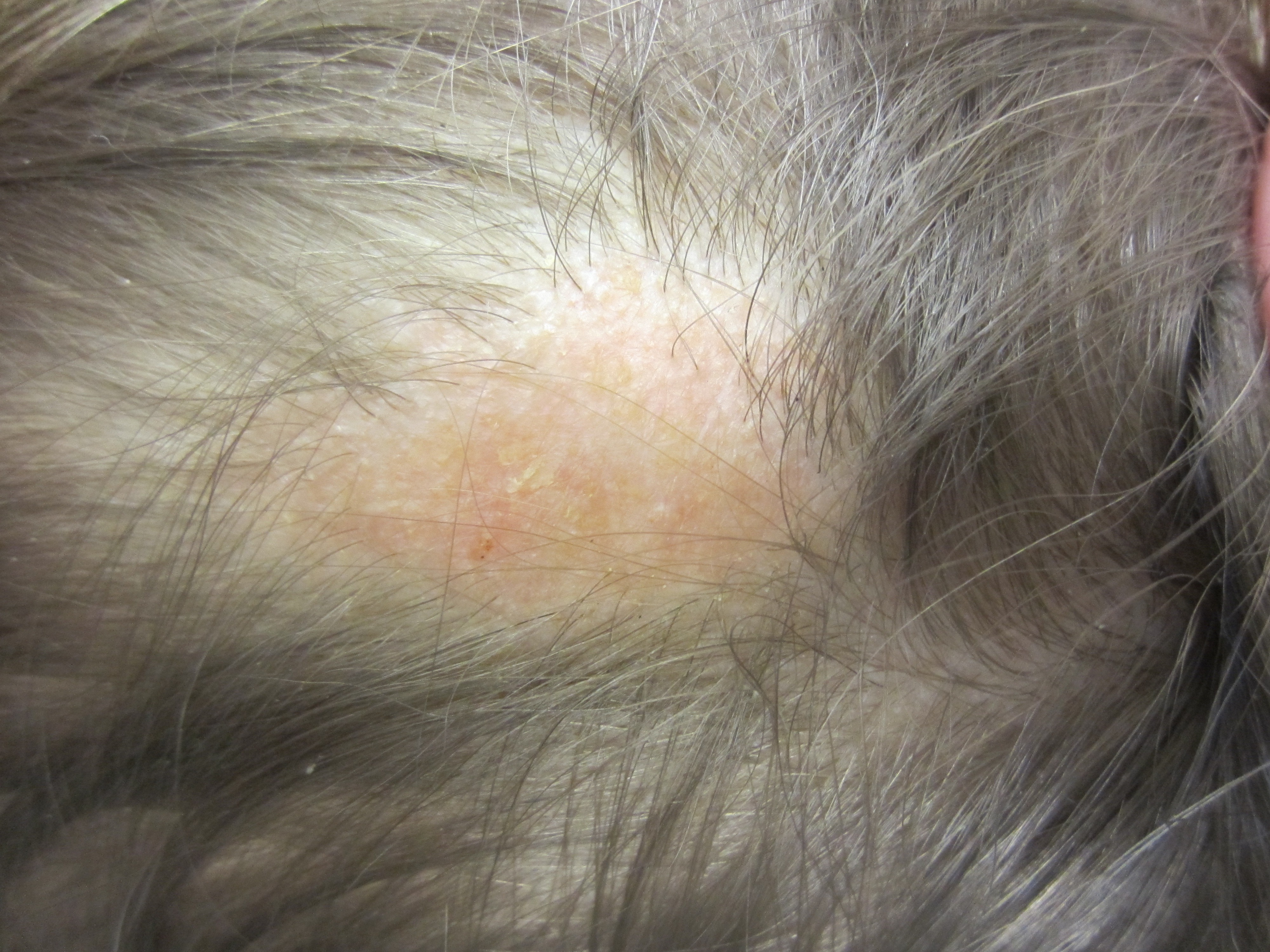
- Specialty: Dermatology

Nevus sebaceus or sebaceous nevus (the first term is its Latin name, the second term is its name in English; also known as an "organoid nevus" and "nevus sebaceus of Jadassohn") is a congenital, hairless plaque that typically occurs on the face or scalp. Such nevi are classified as epidermal nevi and can be present at birth, or early childhood, and affect males and females of all races equally. The condition is named for an overgrowth of sebaceous glands, a relatively uncommon hamartoma, in the area of the nevus. NSJ is first described by Josef Jadassohn in 1895.

Skin growths such as benign tumors and basal cell carcinoma can arise in sebaceous nevi, usually after puberty. Rarely, sebaceous nevi can give rise to sebaceous carcinoma. However, the rate of such malignancies is now known to be less than had been estimated. For this reason, excision is no longer automatically recommended.

== See also ==
- Phakomatosis pigmentokeratotica
- List of cutaneous conditions associated with increased risk of nonmelanoma skin cancer
