= Nevus comedonicus =

Human disease

- Other names: Comedo nevus
- Specialty: Dermatology

Nevus comedonicus, also known as a comedo nevus, is characterized by closely arranged, grouped, often linear, slightly elevated papules that have at their center keratinous plugs resembling comedones.

== See also ==
- Nevus comedonicus syndrome
- Skin lesion
- List of cutaneous conditions
