= Hypergranulosis =

- Specialty: Dermatology

Hypergranulosis is an increased thickness of the stratum granulosum. It is seen in skin diseases with epidermal hyperplasia and orthokeratotic hyperkeratosis.

== See also ==
- Skin lesion
- Skin disease
- List of skin diseases
