= Linear verrucous epidermal nevus =

- Other names: Linear epidermal nevus, and Verrucous epidermal nevus
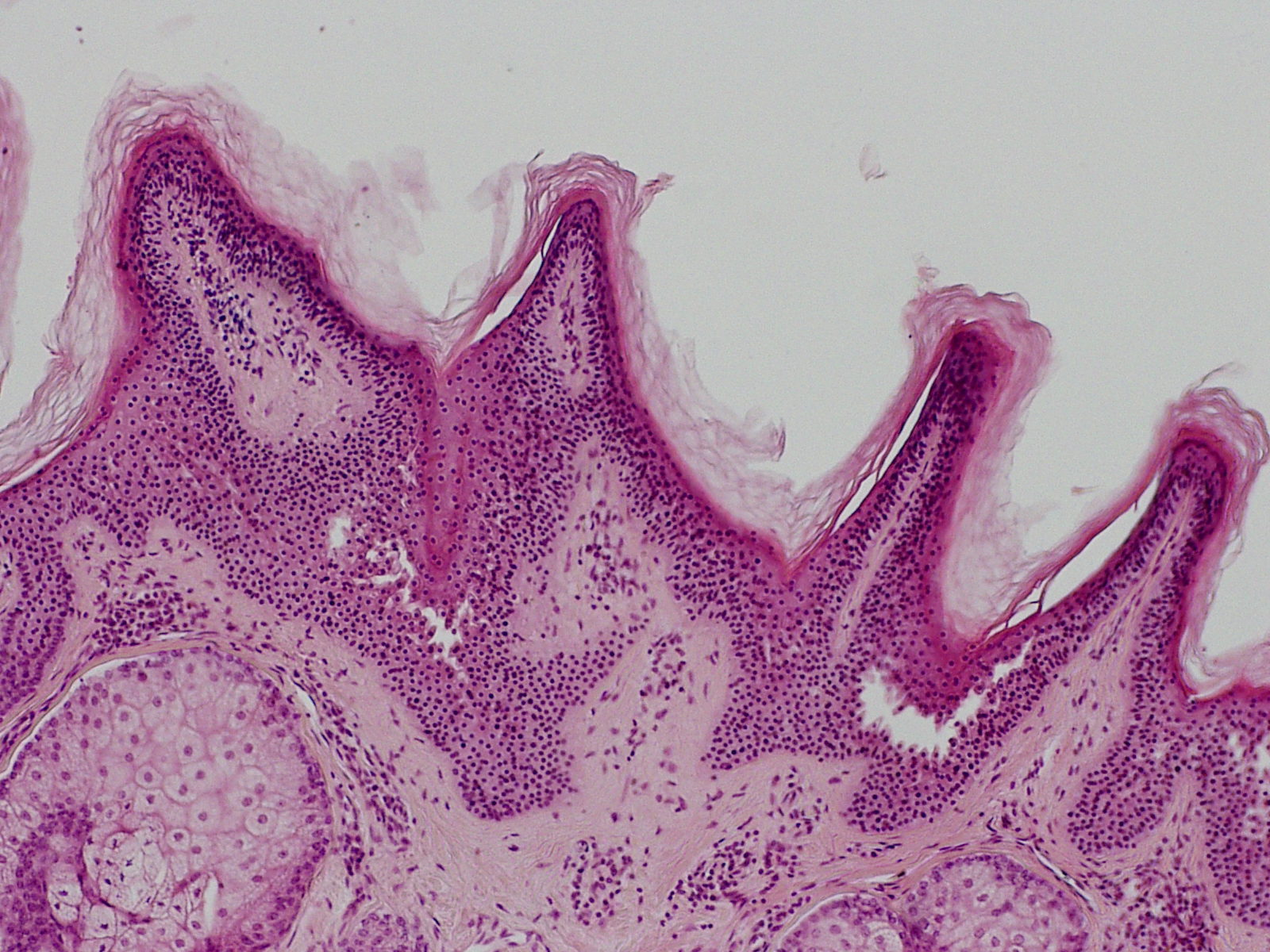
- Specialty: Medical genetics

Linear verrucous epidermal nevus is a skin lesion characterized by a verrucous skin-colored, dirty-gray or brown papule. Generally, multiple papules present simultaneously, and coalesce to form a serpiginous plaque. When this nevus covers a diffuse or extensive portion of the body's surface area, it may be referred to as a systematized epidermal nevus, when it involved only one-half of the body it is called a nevus unius lateris.

== See also ==
- Inflammatory linear verrucous epidermal nevus
- Epidermis
- Skin lesion
- List of cutaneous conditions
