= CHILD syndrome =

- This condition is inherited in an X-linked dominant manner.
- Specialty: Medical genetics

Congenital hemidysplasia with ichthyosiform erythroderma and limb defects (also known as "CHILD syndrome") is a genetic disorder with onset at birth seen almost exclusively in females. The disorder is related to CPDX2, and also has skin and skeletal abnormalities, distinguished by a sharp midline demarcation of the ichthyosis with minimal linear or segmental contralateral involvement.

The acronym was introduced in 1980.

== Symptoms and signs ==
The acronym "CHILD" stands for the symptoms of the syndrome:

- CH = congenital hemidysplasia—one side of the body, most of the time the right side, is poorly developed. The right ribs, neck, vertebrae, etc. may be underdeveloped and the internal organs may be affected.
- I - ichthyosiform erythroderma—at birth or shortly after birth, there are red, inflamed patches (erythroderma), and flaky scales (ichthyosis) on the side of the body that is affected. Hair loss on the same side may also be possible.
- LD - limb defects—fingers on the hand or toes on the foot of the affected side may be missing. An arm or leg may also be shortened or even missing.

== Pathophysiology ==
CHILD syndrome is inherited in an X-linked dominant fashion and is associated with a mutation of the NSDHL gene. This gene encodes for the enzyme 3beta-hydroxy sterol dehydrogenase which catalyzes a step in the cholesterol biosynthetic pathway. Locations of this enzyme include the membranes of the endoplasmic reticulum and on the surface of intracellular lipid storage droplets. A shortage of the enzyme may allow potentially toxic byproducts of cholesterol production to accumulate in the body's tissues. Mutations of the gene have been reported in all three types: missense, nonsense, and stop mutations, all resulting in loss of function of NSDHL. The type of mutation is not believed to be the underlining reason for clinical variations in the extent of involvement but rather the differences in the pattern of X inactivation. Although researchers suspect that low levels of cholesterol and/or an accumulation of other substances are responsible for disrupting the growth and development of many body parts, the precise rationale for the laterality of the syndrome has yet to be determined.

== Diagnosis ==
The symptoms would appear at birth or shortly after birth. The combination of physical symptoms on the child would suggest they have CHILD syndrome. A skin sample examined under a microscope would suggest the characteristics of the syndrome and an X-ray of the trunk, arms, and legs would help to detect underdeveloped bones. A CT scan would help detect problems of the internal organs.

== Treatment ==
There is currently no treatment for CHILD syndrome so any treatment would target the symptoms currently present. Emoillents like Lac-Hydran (ammonium lactate) and Ureaphil (urea) are used to treat scaly patches on the skin. A pediatric orthopedic surgeon can evaluate any underdevelopment in the bones and treat them if necessary.

== Epidemiology ==
=== Frequency ===
CHILD syndrome is a rare disorder with less than 100 recorded cases worldwide thus far in literature.

=== Mortality/morbidity ===
CHILD syndrome is not fatal unless there are problems with the internal organs. The most common causes of early death in people with the syndrome are cardiovascular malformations. However, central nervous system, skeletal, kidney, lung, and other visceral defects also contribute significantly.

=== Gender ===
CHILD syndrome occurs almost exclusively in females. Only 2 known cases have been reported in males, one having a normal 46,XY karyotype, suggesting an early postzygotic somatic mutation.

=== Age ===
Because CHILD syndrome is a congenital disorder, the symptoms may be present at birth or may develop during the first few weeks of life and continue for the lifetime of the patient.

== History ==
The earliest recorded case of CHILD syndrome was in 1903. Otto Sachs was accredited for first describing the clinical characteristics of the syndrome in an 8-year-old girl. The nearest proceeding news on the topic was a report in 1948 by Zellweger and Uelinger, who reported a patient with "half-sided osteochondrodermatitis and nevus ichthyosiformis." The first case of CHILD syndrome with ocular manifestations in a patient with progressive bilateral optic nerve atrophy was recently reported in 2010 by Knape et al.

== Notable people ==
Paralympic skier and medallist Stephanie Jallen competes in classification LW9-1 at the Sochi Winter Paralympics.

== See also ==
- Epidermal nevus syndrome
- List of cutaneous conditions
