= Orthokeratosis =

- Specialty: Dermatology

Orthokeratosis is hyperkeratosis without parakeratosis. No nucleus is seen in the cells. There is also formation of an anuclear keratin layer, as in the normal epidermis.
