= Sulfatolamide =

Chemical compound

Combination of
- Sulfathiourea: Sulfonamide
- Mafenide: Sulfonamide

Clinical data
- ATC code: G01AE01 (WHO)

Identifiers
- CAS Number: 1161-88-2
- PubChem CID: 3034019
- UNII: 3OLH2HAK9F
- KEGG: D01127
- CompTox Dashboard (EPA): DTXSID90151277
- ECHA InfoCard: 100.013.273

Sulfatolamide is a drug used in gynecology. It is a combination of two sulfonamide antibacterials, sulfathiourea and mafenide.
