= Actinic keratosis =

Rough skin induced by UV exposure

- Other names: Solar keratosis; Senile keratosis (SK)
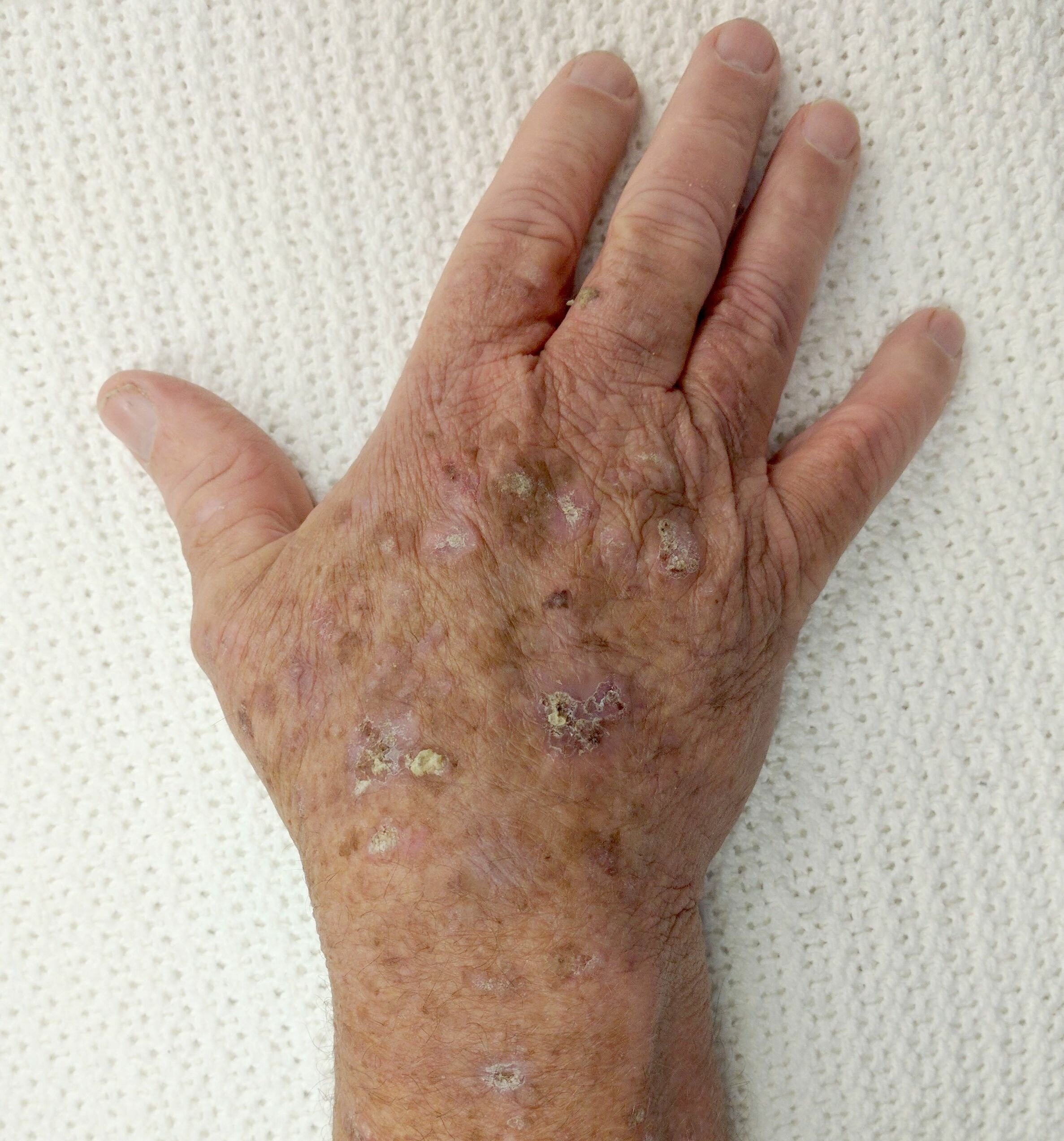
- Actinic keratosis on the back of a hand
- Specialty: Dermatology

Actinic keratosis (AK), sometimes called solar keratosis or senile keratosis, is a pre-cancerous area of thick, scaly, pale or crusty skin. Actinic keratosis is a disorder (-osis) of epidermal keratinocytes that is induced by ultraviolet (UV) light exposure (actin-).

These growths are more common in fair-skinned people and those who are frequently in the sun. They are believed to form when skin gets damaged by UV radiation from the sun or indoor tanning beds, usually over the course of decades. Given their pre-cancerous nature, if left untreated, they may turn into a type of skin cancer called squamous cell carcinoma. Untreated lesions have up to a 20% risk of progression to squamous cell carcinoma, so treatment by a dermatologist is recommended.

Actinic keratoses characteristically appear as thick, scaly, or crusty areas that often feel dry or rough. Size commonly ranges between 2 and 6 millimeters, but they can grow to be several centimeters in diameter. Actinic keratoses are often felt before they are seen, and the texture is sometimes compared to sandpaper. They may be dark, light, tan, pink, red, a combination of all these, or have the same color as the surrounding skin.

Given the causal relationship between sun exposure and actinic keratosis growth, they often appear on a background of sun-damaged skin and in areas that are commonly sun-exposed, such as the face, ears, neck, scalp, chest, backs of hands, forearms, or lips. Because sun exposure is rarely limited to a small area, most people who have an actinic keratosis have more than one.

If clinical examination findings are not typical of actinic keratosis and the possibility of in situ or invasive squamous cell carcinoma (SCC) cannot be excluded based on clinical examination alone, a biopsy or excision can be considered for definitive diagnosis by histologic examination of the lesional tissue. Multiple treatment options for actinic keratosis are available. Photodynamic therapy (PDT) is one option for the treatment of numerous actinic keratosis lesions in a region of the skin, termed field cancerization. It involves the application of a photosensitizer to the skin followed by illumination with a strong light source. Topical creams, such as 5-fluorouracil or imiquimod, may require daily application to affected skin areas over a typical time course of weeks.

Cryotherapy is frequently used for few and well-defined lesions, but undesired skin lightening, or hypopigmentation, may occur at the treatment site. By following up with a dermatologist, actinic keratoses can be treated before they progress to skin cancer. If cancer does develop from an actinic keratosis lesion, it can be caught early with close monitoring, at a time when treatment is likely to have a high cure rate.

== Signs and symptoms ==
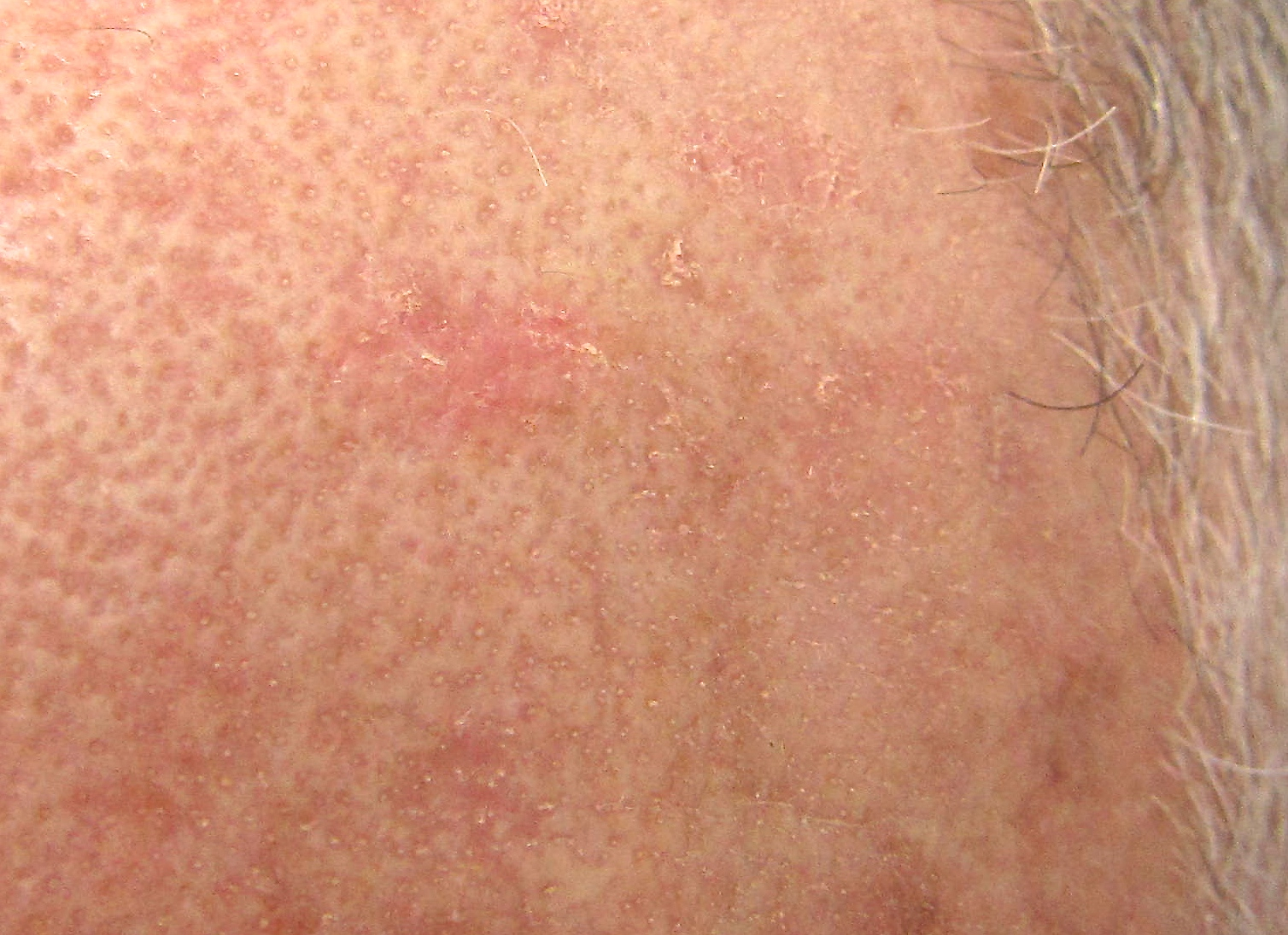
Close-up view of an actinic keratosis lesion

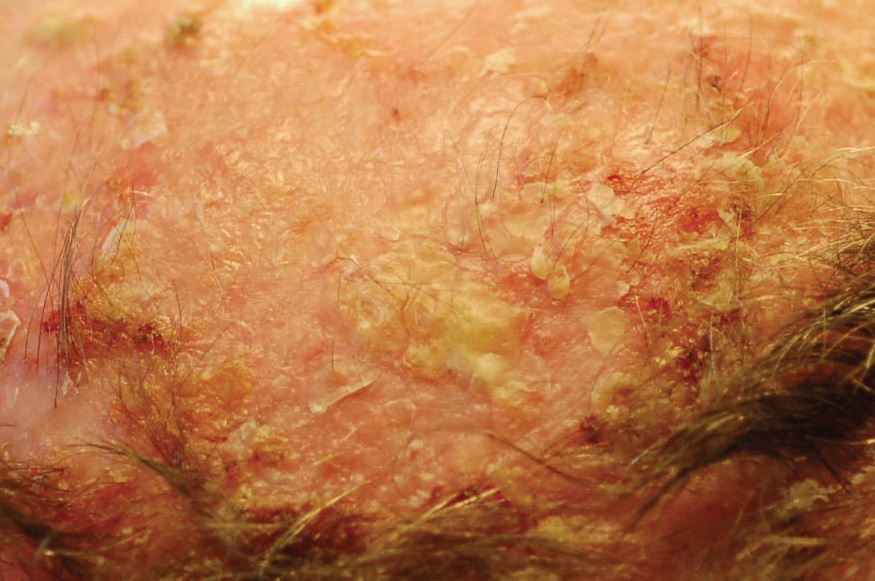
Multiple lesions of actinic keratosis on the scalp.

Actinic keratoses (AKs) most commonly present as a white, scaly plaque of variable thickness with surrounding redness; they have a sandpaper-like texture when felt with a gloved hand. Skin nearby the lesion often shows evidence of solar damage characterized by pigmentary alterations, being yellow or pale in color with areas of hyperpigmentation; deep wrinkles, coarse texture, purpura and ecchymoses, dry skin, and scattered telangiectasias are also characteristic.

Photoaging leads to an accumulation of oncogenic changes, resulting in a proliferation of mutated keratinocytes that can manifest as actinic keratoses or other neoplastic growths.

The lesions are usually asymptomatic, but can be tender, itch, bleed, or produce a stinging or burning sensation. Actinic keratoses are typically graded in accordance with their clinical presentation: Grade I (easily visible, slightly palpable), Grade II (easily visible, palpable), and Grade III (frankly visible and hyperkeratotic).

=== Variants ===
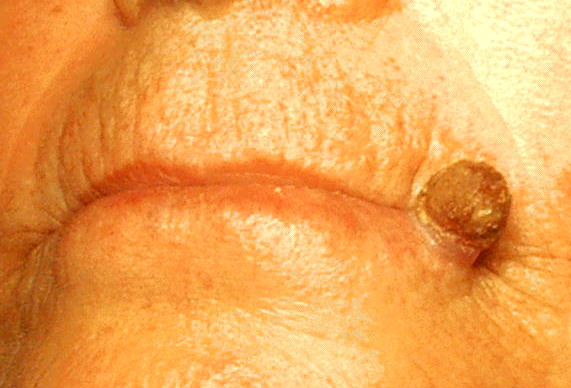
Hyperkeratotic actinic keratosis on lip ("cutaneous horn")

Actinic keratoses can have various clinical presentations, often characterized as follows:

- Classic (or common): Classic actinic keratoses present as white, scaly macules, papules or plaques of various thickness, often with surrounding erythema. They are usually 2–6mm in diameter but can sometimes reach several centimeters in diameter.
- Hypertrophic (or hyperkeratotic): Hypertrophic actinic keratoses (HAKs) appears as a thicker scale or rough papule or plaque, often adherent to an erythematous base. Classic actinic keratoses can progress to become HAKs, and HAKs themselves can be difficult to distinguish from malignant lesions.
- Atrophic: Atrophic actinic keratoses lack an overlying scale, and therefore appear as a nonpalpable change in color (or macule). They are often smooth and red and are less than 10mm in diameter.
- Actinic keratosis with cutaneous horn: A cutaneous horn is a keratinic projection with its height at least one-half of its diameter, often conical in shape. They can be seen in the setting of actinic keratosis as a progression of an HAK, but are also present in other skin conditions. 38–40% of cutaneous horns represent actinic keratoses.
- Pigmented actinic keratosis: Pigmented actinic keratoses are rare variants that often present as macules or plaques that are tan to brown in color. They can be difficult to distinguish from a solar lentigo or lentigo maligna.
- Actinic cheilitis: When an actinic keratosis forms on the lip, it is called actinic cheilitis. This usually presents as a rough, scaly patch on the lip, often accompanied by the sensation of dry mouth and symptomatic splitting of the lips.
- Bowenoid actinic keratosis: Usually presents as a solitary, erythematous, scaly patch or plaque with well-defined borders. Bowenoid actinic keratoses are differentiated from Bowen's disease by degree of epithelial involvement as seen on histology.

The presence of ulceration, nodularity, or bleeding should raise concern for malignancy. Specifically, clinical findings suggesting an increased risk of progression to squamous cell carcinoma can be recognized as "IDRBEU": I (induration/inflammation), D (diameter > 1 cm), R (rapid enlargement), B (bleeding), E (erythema), and U (ulceration). Actinic keratoses are usually diagnosed clinically, but because they are difficult to clinically differentiate from squamous cell carcinoma, any concerning features warrant biopsy for diagnostic confirmation.

== Causes ==
The most important cause of actinic keratosis formation is solar radiation, through a variety of mechanisms. Mutation of the p53 tumor suppressor gene, induced by UV radiation, has been identified as a crucial step in actinic keratosis formation. This tumor suppressor gene, located on chromosome 17p132, allows for cell cycle arrest when DNA or RNA is damaged. Dysregulation of the p53 pathway can thus result in unchecked replication of dysplastic keratinocytes, thereby serving as a source of neoplastic growth and the development of actinic keratosis, as well as possible progression from actinic keratosis to skin cancer. Other molecular markers that have been associated with the development of actinic keratosis include the expression of p16^{ink4}, p14, the CD95 ligand, TNF-related apoptosis-inducing ligand (TRAIL) and TRAIL receptors, and loss of heterozygosity.

Evidence also suggests that the human papillomavirus (HPV) plays a role in the development of actinic keratoses. The HPV virus has been detected in actinic keratoses, with measurable HPV viral loads (one HPV-DNA copy per less than 50 cells) measured in 40% of actinic keratoses. Similar to UV radiation, higher levels of HPV found in actinic keratoses reflect enhanced viral DNA replication. This is suspected to be related to the abnormal keratinocyte proliferation and differentiation in actinic keratoses, which facilitate an environment for HPV replication. This in turn may further stimulate the abnormal proliferation that contributes to the development of actinic keratoses and carcinogenesis.

=== Ultraviolet radiation ===
It is thought that ultraviolet (UV) radiation induces mutations in the keratinocytes of the epidermis, promoting the survival and proliferation of these atypical cells. Both UV-A and UV-B radiation have been implicated as causes of actinic keratoses. UV-A radiation (wavelength 320–400 nm) reaches more deeply into the skin and can lead to the generation of reactive oxygen species, which in turn can damage cell membranes, signaling proteins, and nucleic acids. UV-B radiation (wavelength 290–320 nm) causes thymidine dimer formation in DNA and RNA, leading to significant cellular mutations. In particular, mutations in the p53 tumor suppressor gene have been found in 30–50% of actinic keratosis lesion skin samples.

UV radiation has also been shown to cause elevated inflammatory markers such as arachidonic acid, as well as other molecules associated with inflammation. Eventually, over time these changes lead to the formation of actinic keratoses. Several predictors for increased actinic keratosis risk from UV radiation have been identified:

- Extent of sun exposure: Cumulative sun exposure leads to an increased risk for development of actinic keratoses. In one study, actinic keratoses were found in 55% of fair-skinned men with high cumulative sun exposure, and in only 19% of fair-skinned men with low cumulative sun exposure in an age-matched cohort (the percents for women in this same study were 37% and 12% respectively). Furthermore, the use of sunscreen (SPF 17 or higher) has been found to significantly reduce the development of actinic keratosis lesions, and also promotes the regression of existing lesions.
- History of sunburn: Studies show that even a single episode of painful sunburn as a child can increase an individual's risk of developing actinic keratosis as an adult. Six or more painful sunburns over the course of a lifetime was found to be significantly associated with the likelihood of developing actinic keratosis.

=== Skin pigmentation ===
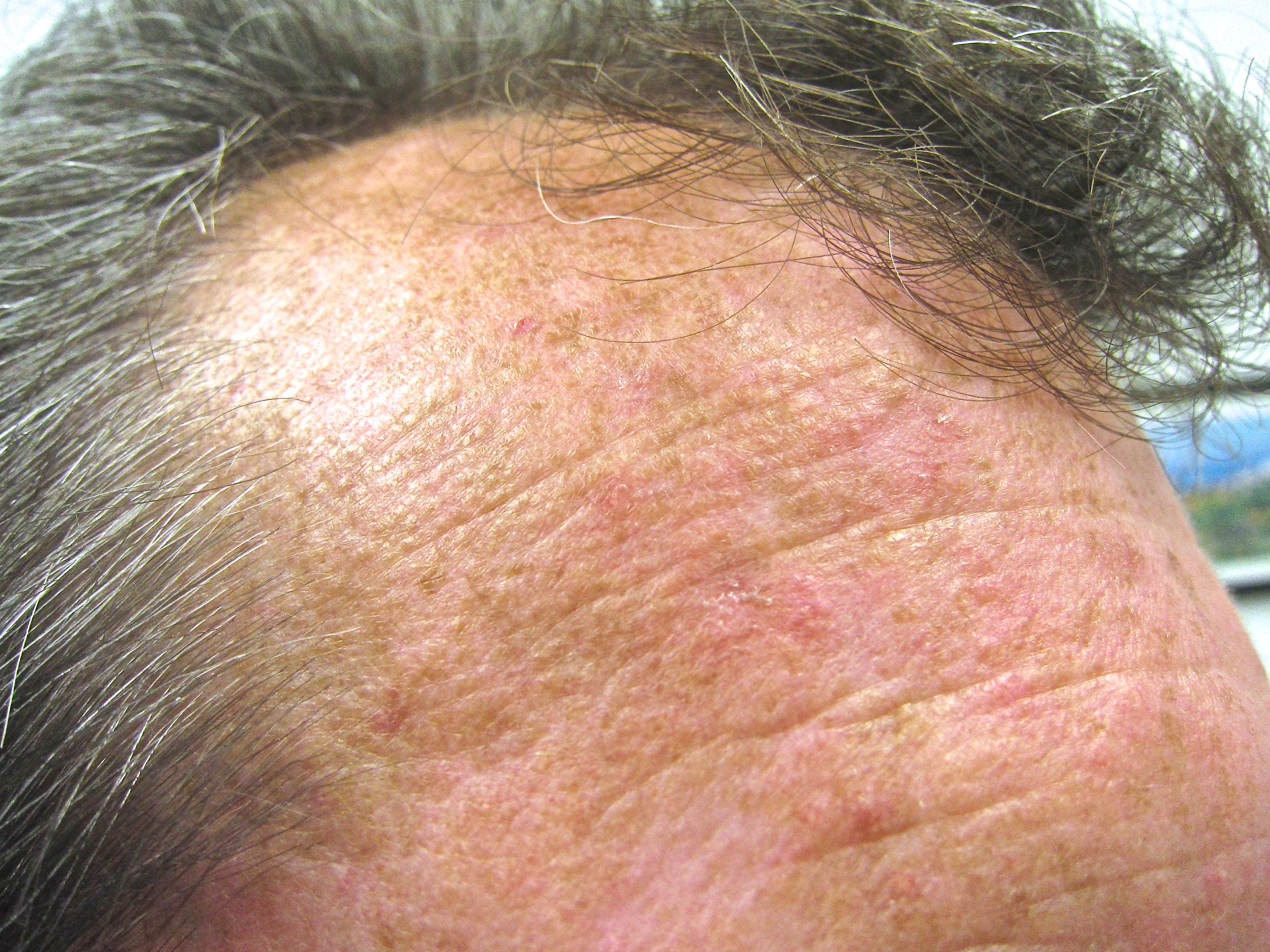
Actinic keratoses on the forehead of a male

Melanin is a pigment in the epidermis that functions to protect keratinocytes from the damage caused by UV radiation; it is found in higher concentrations in the epidermis of darker-skinned individuals, affording them protection against the development of actinic keratoses.

Fair-skinned individuals have a significantly increased risk of developing actinic keratoses when compared to olive-skinned individuals (odds ratios of 14.1 and 6.5, respectively), and actinic keratoses are uncommon in dark-skinned people of African descent. Other phenotypic features seen in fair-skinned individuals that are associated with an increased propensity to develop actinic keratoses include:

- Freckling
- Light hair and eye color
- Propensity to sunburn
- Inability to tan

=== Other risk factors ===
- Immunosuppression: People with a compromised immune system from medical conditions (such as AIDS) or immunosuppressive therapy (such as chronic immunosuppression after organ transplantation, or chemotherapy for cancer) are at increased risk for developing actinic keratoses. They may develop actinic keratosis at an earlier age or have an increased number of actinic keratosis lesions compared to immunocompetent people.
- Human papillomavirus (HPV): The role of HPV in the development of actinic keratosis remains unclear, but evidence suggests that infection with the betapapillomavirus type of HPV may be associated with an increased likelihood of AK.
- Genodermatoses: Certain genetic disorders interfere with DNA repair after sun exposure, thereby putting these individuals at higher risk for the development of actinic keratoses. Examples of such genetic disorders include xeroderma pigmentosum and Bloom syndrome.
- Balding: actinic keratoses are commonly found on the scalps of balding men. The degree of baldness seems to be a risk factor for lesion development, as men with severe baldness were found to be seven times more likely to have 10 or more actinic keratoses when compared to men with minimal or no baldness. This observation can be explained by an absence of hair causing a larger proportion of scalp to be exposed to UV radiation if other sun protection measures are not taken.

== Diagnosis ==
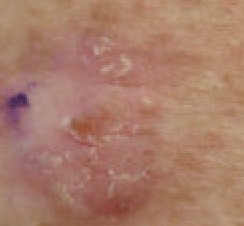
Actinic keratosis, left upper paraspinal back

Physicians usually diagnose actinic keratosis by doing a thorough physical examination, through a combination of visual observation and touch. However a biopsy may be necessary when the keratosis is large in diameter, thick, or bleeding, in order to make sure that the lesion is not a skin cancer. Actinic keratosis may progress to invasive squamous cell carcinoma (SCC) but both diseases can present similarly upon physical exam and can be difficult to distinguish clinically.

Histological examination of the lesion from a biopsy or excision may be necessary to definitively distinguish actinic keratosis from in situ or invasive SCC. In addition to SCCs, actinic keratoses can be mistaken for other cutaneous lesions including seborrheic keratoses, basal cell carcinoma, lichenoid keratosis, porokeratosis, viral warts, erosive pustular dermatosis of the scalp, pemphigus foliaceus, inflammatory dermatoses like psoriasis, or melanoma.

=== Biopsy ===
A lesion biopsy is performed if the diagnosis remains uncertain after a clinical physical exam, or if there is suspicion that the actinic keratosis might have progressed to squamous cell carcinoma. The most common tissue sampling techniques include shave or punch biopsy. When only a portion of the lesion can be removed due to its size or location, the biopsy should sample tissue from the thickest area of the lesion, as SCCs are most likely to be detected in that area.

If a shave biopsy is performed, it should extend through to the level of the dermis in order to provide sufficient tissue for diagnosis; ideally, it would extend to the mid-reticular dermis. Punch biopsy usually extends to the subcutaneous fat when the entire length of the punch blade is utilized.

==== Histopathology ====
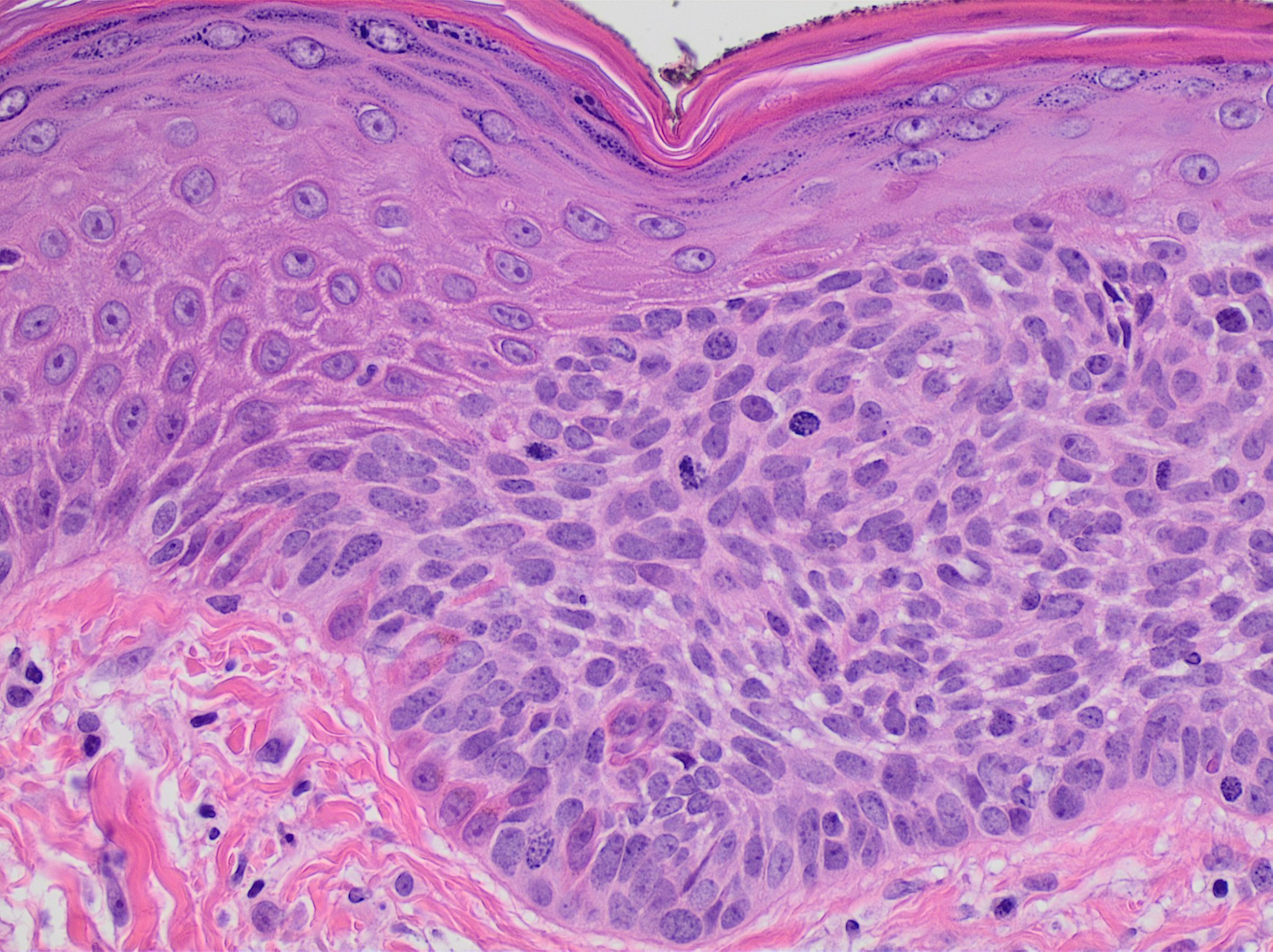
Normal skin (left) and actinic keratosis (right) with the defining characteristic of atypical basal keratinocytes that do not involve the full thickness of the epidermis.

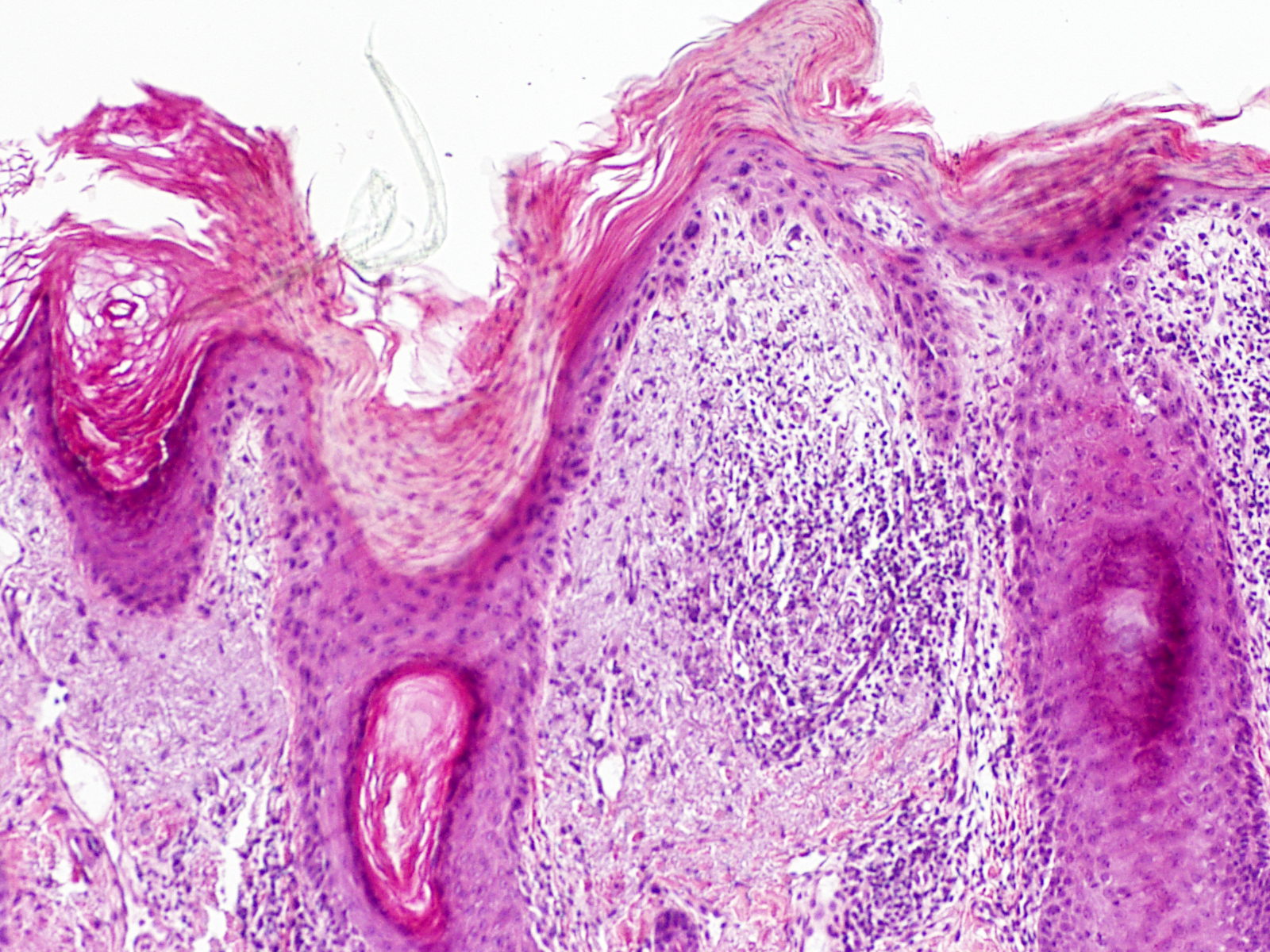
Actinic keratosis, atrophic form

On histologic examination, actinic keratoses usually show a collection of atypical keratinocytes with hyperpigmented or pleomorphic nuclei, extending to the basal layer of the epidermis. A "flag sign" is often described, referring to alternating areas of orthokeratosis and parakeratosis. Epidermal thickening and surrounding areas of sun-damaged skin are often seen. The normal ordered maturation of the keratinocytes is disordered to varying degrees: there may be widening of the intracellular spaces, cytologic atypia such as abnormally large nuclei, and a mild chronic inflammatory infiltrate.

Specific findings depend on the clinical variant and particular lesion characteristics. The seven major histopathologic variants are all characterized by atypical keratinocytic proliferation beginning in the basal layer and confined to the epidermis; they include:

- Hypertrophic: Notable for marked hyperkeratosis, often with evident parakeratosis. Keratinocytes in the stratum malphigii may show a loss of polarity, pleomorphism, and anaplasia. Some irregular downward proliferation into the uppermost dermis may be observed, but does not represent frank invasion.
- Atrophic: With slight hyperkeratosis and overall atrophic changes to the epidermis; the basal layer shows cells with large, hyperchromatic nuclei in close proximity to each other. These cells have been observed to proliferate into the dermis as buds and duct-like structures.
- Lichenoid: Demonstrate a band-like lymphocytic infiltrate in the papillary dermis, directly beneath the dermal-epidermal junction.
- Achantholytic: Intercellular clefts or lacunae in the lowermost epidermal layer that result from anaplastic changes; these produce dyskeratotic cells with disrupted intercellular bridges.
- Bowenoid: This term is controversial and usually refers to full-thickness atypia, microscopically indistinguishable from Bowen's Disease. However most dermatologists and pathologists will use it in reference to tissue samples that are notable for small foci of atypia that involve the full thickness of the epidermis, in the background of a lesion that is otherwise consistent with an actinic keratosis.
- Epidermolytic: With granular degeneration.
- Pigmented: Show pigmentation in the basal layer of the epidermis, similar to a solar lentigo.

=== Dermoscopy ===
Dermoscopy is a noninvasive technique utilizing a handheld magnifying device coupled with a transilluminating lift. It is often used in the evaluation of cutaneous lesions but lacks the definitive diagnostic ability of biopsy-based tissue diagnosis. Histopathologic exam remains the gold standard.

Polarized contact dermoscopy of actinic keratoses occasionally reveals a "rosette sign," described as four white points arranged in a clover pattern, often localized to within a follicular opening. It is hypothesized that the "rosette sign" corresponds histologically to the changes of orthokeratosis and parakeratosis known as the "flag sign."

- Non-pigmented actinic keratoses: linear or wavy vascular patterning, or a "strawberry pattern," described as unfocused vessels between hair follicles, with white-haloed follicular openings.
- Pigmented actinic keratoses: gray to brown dots or globules surrounding follicular openings, and annular-granular rhomboidal structures; often difficult to differentiate from lentigo maligna.

== Prevention ==
Ultraviolet radiation is believed to contribute to the development of actinic keratoses by inducing mutations in epidermal keratinocytes, leading to proliferation of atypical cells. Therefore, preventive measures for actinic keratoses are targeted at limiting exposure to solar radiation, including:

- Limiting extent of sun exposure
  - Avoid sun exposure during noontime hours between 10:00 AM and 2:00 PM when UV light is most powerful
  - Minimize all time in the sun, since UV exposure occurs even in the winter and on cloudy days
- Using sun protection
  - Applying sunscreens with SPF ratings 30 or greater that also block both UVA and UVB light, at least every 2 hours and after swimming or sweating
  - Applying sunscreen at least 15 minutes before going outside, as this allows time for the sunscreen to be absorbed appropriately by the skin
  - Wearing sun protective clothing such as hats, sunglasses, long-sleeved shirts, long skirts, or trousers. "Consider taking 10 micrograms of vitamin D a day if you always cover up outdoors. This is because you may not get enough vitamin D from sunlight."

== Management ==
There are a variety of treatment options for actinic keratosis depending on the patient and the clinical characteristics of the lesion. Actinic keratoses show a wide range of features, which guide decision-making in choosing treatment. As there are multiple effective treatments, patient preference and lifestyle are also factors that physicians consider when determining the management plan for actinic keratosis. Regular follow-up is advisable after any treatment to make sure no new lesions have developed and that old ones are not progressing. Adding topical treatment after a procedure may improve outcomes.

=== Medication ===
Topical medications are often recommended for areas where multiple or ill-defined actinic keratoses are present, as the medication can easily be used to treat a relatively large area.

==== Fluorouracil cream ====
Topical fluorouracil (5-FU) destroys actinic keratoses by blocking methylation of thymidylate synthetase, thereby interrupting DNA and RNA synthesis. This in turn prevents the proliferation of dysplastic cells in AK. Topical 5-FU is the most utilized treatment for AK, and often results in effective removal of the lesion. Overall, there is a 50% efficacy rate resulting in 100% clearance of actinic keratoses treated with topical 5-FU. 5-FU may be up to 90% effective in treating non-hyperkeratotic lesions. While topical 5-FU is a widely used and cost-effective treatment for actinic keratoses and is generally well tolerated, its potential side-effects can include: pain, crusting, redness, and local swelling. These adverse effects can be mitigated or minimized by reducing the frequency of application or taking breaks between uses. The most commonly used application regimen consists of applying a layer of topical cream to the lesion twice a day after washing; duration of treatment is typically 2–4 weeks to thinner skin like the cheeks and up to 8 weeks for the arms; treatment of up to 8 weeks has demonstrated a higher cure rate.

Calcipotriol combined with 5-fluorouracil has been found to be an effective treatment.

==== Imiquimod cream ====
Imiquimod is a topical immune-enhancing agent licensed for the treatment of genital warts. Imiquimod stimulates the immune system through the release and up-regulation of cytokines. Treatment with Imiquimod cream applied 2–3 times per week for 12 to 16 weeks was found to result in complete resolution of actinic keratoses in 50% of people, compared to 5% of controls. The Imiquimod 3.75% cream has been validated in a treatment regimen consisting of daily application to entire face and scalp for two 2-week treatment cycles, with a complete clearance rate of 36%.

While the clearance rate observed with the Imiquimod 3.75% cream was lower than that observed with the 5% cream (36 and 50 percent, respectively), there are lower reported rates of adverse reactions with the 3.75% cream: 19% of individuals using Imiquimod 3.75% cream reported adverse reactions including local erythema, scabbing, and flaking at the application site, while nearly a third of individuals using the 5% cream reported the same types of reactions with Imiquimod treatment. However, it is ultimately difficult to compare the efficacy of the different strength creams directly, as study data varies in methodology (e.g. duration and frequency of treatment, and amount of skin surface area covered).

==== Ingenol mebutate gel ====
Ingenol mebutate is a treatment for actinic keratosis used in Europe and the United States. It works in two ways, first by disrupting cell membranes and mitochondria resulting cell death, and then by inducing antibody-dependent cellular cytotoxicity to eliminate remaining tumor cells. Treatment with the 0.015% gel was found to completely clear 57% of AK, while the 0.05% gel had a 34% clearance rate. Advantages of ingenol mebutate treatment include the short duration of therapy and a low recurrence rate. Ingenol mebutate has been withdrawn from the market worldwide since 2020 following safety concerns regarding an increased risk of skin cancer (squamous cell carcinoma) compared to other treatment options.

==== Diclofenac sodium gel ====
Topical diclofenac sodium gel is a nonsteroidal anti-inflammatory drug that is thought to work in the treatment of actinic keratosis through its inhibition of the arachidonic acid pathway, thereby limiting the production of prostaglandins which are thought to be involved in the development of UVB-induced skin cancers. Treatment of facial actinic keratosis with diclofenac gel led to complete lesion resolution in 40% of cases. Common side effects include dryness, itching, redness, and rash at the site of application.

==== Retinoids ====
Topical retinoids have been studied in the treatment of actinic keratosis with modest results, and the American Academy of Dermatology does not recommend this as first-line therapy. Treatment with adapalene gel daily for 4 weeks, and then twice daily thereafter for a total of nine months led to a significant but modest reduction in the number of actinic keratoses compared to placebo; it demonstrated the additional advantage of improving the appearance of photodamaged skin.

Topical tretinoin is ineffective as treatment for reducing the number of actinic keratoses. For secondary prevention of actinic keratosis, systemic, low-dose acitretin was found to be safe, well tolerated and moderately effective in chemoprophylaxis for skin cancers in kidney transplant patients. Acitretin is a viable treatment option for organ transplant patients according to expert opinion.

==== Tirbanibulin ====
Tirbanibulin (Klisyri) was approved for medical use in the United States in December 2020, for the treatment of actinic keratosis on the face or scalp.

=== Procedures ===
==== Cryotherapy ====
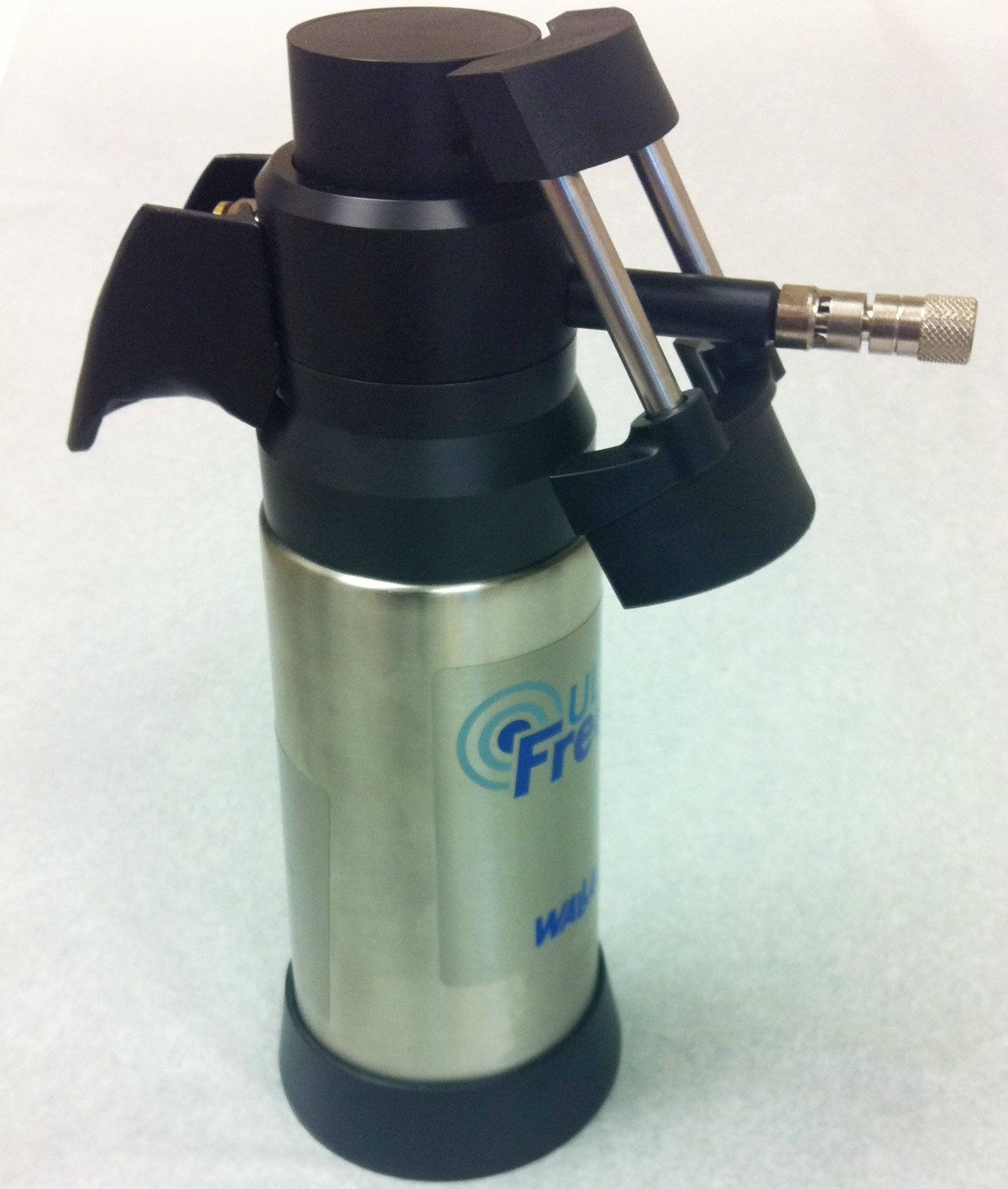
Cryosurgery instrument used to treat actinic keratoses

Liquid nitrogen (−195.8 °C) is the most commonly used destructive therapy for the treatment of actinic keratosis in the United States. It is a well-tolerated office procedure that does not require anesthesia.

Cryotherapy is particularly indicated for cases where there are fewer than 15 thin, well-demarcated lesions. Caution is encouraged for thicker, more hyperkeratotic lesions, as dysplastic cells may evade treatment. Treatment with both cryotherapy and field treatment can be considered for these more advanced lesions. Cryotherapy is generally performed using an open-spray technique, wherein the actinic keratosis is sprayed for several seconds.

The process can be repeated multiple times in one office visit, as tolerated. Cure rates from 67 to 99 percent have been reported, depending on freeze time and lesion characteristics. Disadvantages include discomfort during and after the procedure; blistering, scarring and redness; hypo- or hyperpigmentation; and destruction of healthy tissue.

==== Photodynamic therapy ====
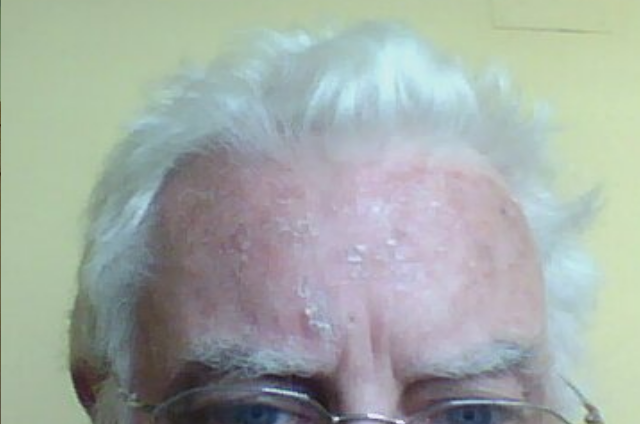
Interim result of phototherapy for actinic keratosis with methyl aminolevulinate one week after exposure. Patient has light skin, blue eyes.

Actinic keratoses are one of the most common dermatologic lesions for which photodynamic therapy, including topical methyl aminolevulinate (MAL) or 5-aminolevulinic acid (5-ALA), is indicated.

Treatment begins with preparation of the lesion, which includes scraping away scales and crusts using a dermal curette. A thick layer of topical MAL or 5-ALA cream is applied to the lesion and a small area surrounding the lesion, which is then covered with an occlusive dressing and left for a period of time. During this time the photosensitizer accumulates in the target cells within the actinic keratosis lesion. The dressings are then removed and the lesion is treated with light at a specified wavelength.

Multiple treatment regimens using different photosensitizers, incubation times, light sources, and pretreatment regimens have been studied and suggest that longer incubation times lead to higher rates of lesion clearance. Photodynamic therapy is gaining in popularity. It has been found to have a 14% higher likelihood of achieving complete lesion clearance at 3 months compared to cryotherapy, and seems to result in superior cosmetic outcomes when compared to cryotherapy or 5-FU treatment. Photodynamic therapy can be particularly effective in treating areas with multiple actinic keratosis lesions.

==== Surgical techniques ====
- Surgical excision is a rarely utilized technique for actinic keratosis treatment.
- Shave excision and curettage (sometimes followed by electrodesiccation when deemed appropriate by the physician): This technique is often used for treatment of actinic keratoses, and particularly for lesions appearing more similar to squamous cell carcinoma, or those that are unresponsive to other treatments. The surface of the lesion can be scraped away using a scalpel, or the base can be removed with a curette. Tissue can be evaluated histopathologically under the microscope, but specimens acquired using this technique are not often adequate to determine whether a lesion is invasive or intraepidermal.
- Dermabrasion: Dermabrasion is useful in the treatment of large areas with multiple actinic keratosis lesions. The process involves using a hand-held instrument to "sand" the skin, removing the stratum corneum layer of the epidermis. Diamond fraises or wire brushes revolving at high speeds are used. The procedure can be quite painful and requires procedural sedation and anesthetic, necessitating a hospital stay. One-year clearance rates with dermabrasion treatment are as high as 96%, but diminish drastically to 54% at five years.

==== Laser therapy ====
Laser therapy using carbon dioxide (CO_{2}) or erbium:yttrium aluminum garnet (Er:YAG) lasers is a treatment approach being utilized with increased frequency, and sometimes in conjunction with computer scanning technology. Laser therapy has not been extensively studied, but evidence suggests it may be effective in cases involving multiple actinic keratoses refractive to medical therapy, or actinic keratoses located in cosmetically sensitive locations such as the face. The CO_{2} laser has been recommended for extensive actinic cheilitis that has not responded to 5-FU.

==== Chemical peels ====
A chemical peel is a topically applied agent that wounds the outermost layer of the skin, promoting organized repair, exfoliation, and eventually the development of smooth and rejuvenated skin. Multiple therapies have been studied. A medium-depth peel may effectively treat multiple non-hyperkeratotic actinic keratoses. It can be achieved with 35% to 50% trichloroacetic acid (TCA) alone or at 35% in combination with Jessner's solution in a once-daily application for a minimum of 3 weeks; 70% glycolic acid (α-hydroxy acid); or solid CO_{2}.

When compared to treatment with 5-FU, chemical peels have demonstrated similar efficacy and increased ease of use with similar morbidity. Chemical peels must be performed in a controlled clinic environment and are recommended only for individuals who are able to comply with follow-up precautions, including avoidance of sun exposure. Furthermore, they should be avoided in individuals with a history of HSV infection or keloids, and in those who are immunosuppressed or who are taking photosensitizing medications.

== Prognosis ==
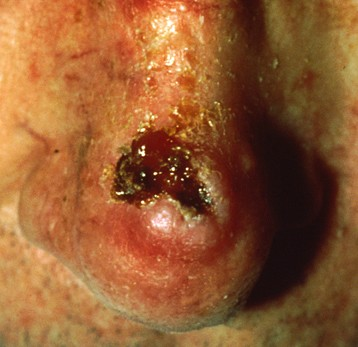
Squamous cell carcinoma of the nose. This skin cancer can develop from actinic keratoses if they are not treated.

Untreated actinic keratoses follow one of three paths: they can either persist as actinic keratoses, regress, or progress to invasive skin cancer, as actinic keratosis lesions are considered to be on the same continuum with squamous cell carcinoma (SCC). Actinic keratosis lesions that regress also have the potential to recur.

- Progression: The overall risk of an actinic keratosis turning into invasive cancer is low. In average-risk individuals, likelihood of an actinic keratosis lesion progressing to SCC is less than 1% per year. Despite this low rate of progression, studies suggest that a full 60% of SCCs arise from pre-existing actinic keratoses, reinforcing the idea that these lesions are closely related.
- Regression: Reported regression rates for single actinic keratosis lesions have ranged between 15 and 63% after one year.
- Recurrence: Recurrence rates after 1 year for single actinic keratosis lesions that have regressed range between 15 and 53%.

=== Clinical course ===
Given the aforementioned differering clinical outcomes, it is difficult to predict the clinical course of any given actinic keratosis. Actinic keratosis lesions may also come and go—in a cycle of appearing on the skin, remaining for months, and then disappearing. Often they will reappear in a few weeks or months, particularly after unprotected sun exposure. Left untreated, there is a chance that the lesion will advance to become invasive. Although it is difficult to predict whether an actinic keratosis will advance to become squamous cell carcinoma, it has been noted that squamous cell carcinomas originate in lesions formerly diagnosed as actinic keratoses with frequencies reported between 65 and 97%.

== Epidemiology ==
Actinic keratosis is very common, with an estimated 14% of dermatology visits related to actinic keratoses. It is seen more often in fair-skinned individuals, and rates vary with geographical location and age. Other factors such as exposure to ultraviolet (UV) radiation, certain phenotypic features, and immunosuppression can also contribute to the development of actinic keratoses.

Men are more likely to develop actinic keratosis than women, and the risk of developing actinic keratosis lesions increases with age. These findings have been observed in multiple studies, with numbers from one study suggesting that approximately 5% of women ages 20–29 develop actinic keratosis compared to 68% of women ages 60–69, and 10% of men ages 20–29 develop actinic keratosis compared to 79% of men ages 60–69.

Geography seems to play a role in the sense that individuals living in locations where they are exposed to more UV radiation throughout their lifetime have a significantly higher risk of developing actinic keratosis. Much of the literature on actinic keratosis comes from Australia, where the prevalence of actinic keratosis is estimated at 40–50% in adults over 40, as compared to the United States and Europe, where prevalence is estimated at under 11–38% in adults. One study found that those who immigrated to Australia after age 20 had fewer actinic keratoses than native Australians in all age groups.

== Research ==
Research implicating human papillomavirus (HPV) in the development of actinic keratoses suggests that HPV prevention might in turn help prevent development of actinic keratoses, as UV-induced mutations and oncogenic transformation are likely facilitated in cases of active HPV infection. A key component of HPV prevention includes vaccination.

There are some data that in individuals with a history of non-melanoma skin cancer, a low-fat diet can serve as a preventative measure against future actinic keratoses.

Diagnostically, researchers are investigating the role of novel biomarkers to assist in determining which actinic keratoses are more likely to develop into cutaneous or metastatic SCC. Upregulation of matrix metalloproteinases (MMP) is seen in many different types of cancers, and the expression and production of MMP-7 in particular has been found to be elevated in SCC specifically. The role of serin peptidase inhibitors (Serpins) is also being investigated. SerpinA1 was found to be elevated in the keratinocytes of SCC cell lines, and SerpinA1 upregulation was correlated with SCC tumor progression in vivo.

In terms of treatment, a number of medications are being studied. Resiquimod is a TLR 7/8 agonist that works similarly to imiquimod, but is 10 to 100 times more potent; when used to treat actinic keratosis lesions, complete response rates have range from 40 to 74%. Afamelanotide is a drug that induces the production of melanin by melanocytes to act as a protective factor against UVB radiation. It is being studied to determine its efficacy in preventing actinic keratoses in organ transplant patients who are on immunosuppressive therapy. Epidermal growth factor receptor (EGFR) inhibitors such as gefitinib, and anti-EGFR antibodies such as cetuximab are used in the treatment of various types of cancers, and are being investigated for potential use in the treatment and prevention of actinic keratoses.
