= Sulfamerazine =

Chemical compound

Clinical data
- AHFS/Drugs.com: International Drug Names
- ATC code: D06BA06 (WHO) J01ED07 (WHO) QJ01EQ17 (WHO)

Identifiers
- IUPAC name: 4-amino-N-(4-methylpyrimidin-2-yl) benzenesulfonamide
- CAS Number: 127-79-7
- PubChem CID: 5325
- DrugBank: DB01581
- ChemSpider: 5134
- UNII: UR1SAB295F
- KEGG: D02435
- ChEBI: CHEBI:102130
- ChEMBL: ChEMBL438
- CompTox Dashboard (EPA): DTXSID0023612
- ECHA InfoCard: 100.004.425

Chemical and physical data
- Formula: C_{11}H_{12}N_{4}O_{2}S
- Molar mass: 264.30 g·mol^{−1}
- 3D model (JSmol): Interactive image
- Melting point: 234 to 238 °C (453 to 460 °F)
- SMILES: O=S(=O)(Nc1nc(ccn1)C)c2ccc(N)cc2
- InChI: InChI=1S/C11H12N4O2S/c1-8-6-7-13-11(14-8)15-18(16,17)10-4-2-9(12)3-5-10/h2-7H,12H2,1H3,(H,13,14,15); Key:QPPBRPIAZZHUNT-UHFFFAOYSA-N

Sulfamerazine is a sulfonamide antibacterial.

== Synthesis ==
Sulfamerazine synthesis: U.S. patent 2,378,813

== See also ==
- Sulfadiazine
- Sulfamethazine
- Sulfamethizole
