= C7H10N2O2S =

The molecular formula C_{7}H_{10}N_{2}O_{2}S may refer to:

- Carbimazole, drug used to treat hyperthyroidism
- Mafenide, a sulfonamide-type medication used as an antibiotic
