= C11H16N2O5 =

The molecular formula C_{11}H_{16}N_{2}O_{5} (molar mass: 256.258 g/mol) may refer to:

- Edoxudine
- Talaglumetad
