= Lentigo maligna melanoma =

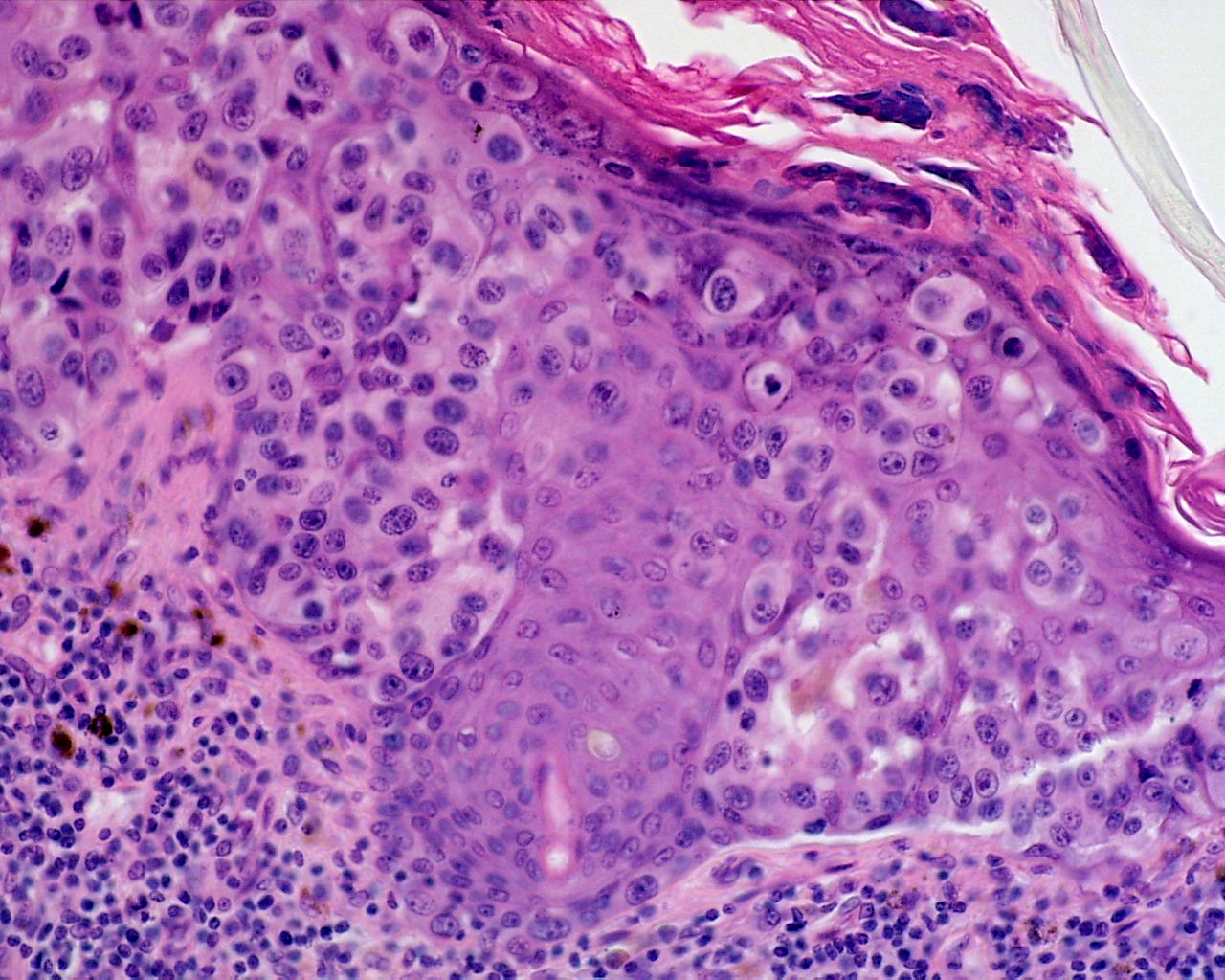
- Specialty: Oncology, dermatology

Lentigo maligna melanoma is a melanoma that has evolved from a lentigo maligna, as seen as a lentigo maligna with melanoma cells invading below the boundaries of the epidermis. They are usually found on chronically sun damaged skin such as the face and the forearms of the elderly.

Lentigo maligna is the non-invasive skin growth that some pathologists consider to be a melanoma-in-situ. A few pathologists do not consider lentigo maligna to be a melanoma at all, but a precursor to melanomas. Once a lentigo maligna becomes a lentigo maligna melanoma, it is treated as if it were an invasive melanoma.

== Presentation ==
An invasive tumor arising from a classical lentigo maligna. Usually a darkly pigmented raised papule or nodule, arising from a patch of irregularly pigmented flat brown to dark brown lesion of sun exposed skin of the face or arms in an elderly patient.

== Diagnosis ==
The first problem is difficulty. As lentigo malignas often present on severely sun damaged skin, it is frequently found amongst numerous pigmented lesions – thin seborrheic keratoses, lentigo senilis, lentigines. It is difficult to distinguish these lesions with the naked eye alone, and even with some difficulty using dermatoscopy. As the lentigo maligna is often very large, it often merges with, or encompasses other skin tumors – such as lentigines, melanocytic nevi, and seborrheic keratosis.

The second difficulty is the biopsy technique. Even though excisional biopsy (removing the entire lesion) is ideal, and advocated by pathologists, practical considerations may indicate that this should not be done. These tumors are often large and presenting on the facial area. Excision of such large tumor would be absolutely contraindicated if the lesion's identity is uncertain. The preferred method of diagnosis is by using a shave biopsy because punch biopsies give up to an 80% false negative rate. While one section of the tumor might show benign melanocytic nevus, another section might show features concerning of severe cellular atypia. When cellular atypia is noted, a pathologist might indicate that the entire lesion should be removed. It is at this point that one can comfortably remove the entire lesion, thus confirming the final diagnosis of lentigo maligna. Despite the high false negative rate, punch biopsies are often used and the size of the punch biopsy can vary from 1 mm to 2 mm, but it is preferred to use a punch 1.5 mm or larger. Representative samples of the most atypical part of the nevus should be biopsy, often by the aid of dermatoscopy.

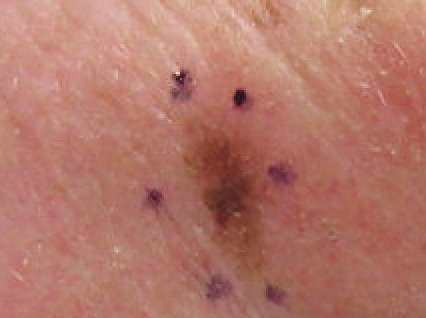
Lentigo Maligna Melanoma, Left Central Malar Cheek marked for biopsy

== Treatment ==
Treatment depends on the thickness of the invasive component of the lentigo maligna. Treatment is essentially identical to other melanomas of the same thickness and stage.

== See also ==
- Melanoma
