= C21H21N3O3 =

The chemical formula C_{21}H_{21}N_{3}O_{3} represents a compound composed of carbon (C), hydrogen (H), nitrogen (N), and oxygen (O) atoms. The molecular formula C_{21}H_{21}N_{3}O_{3} may refer to:

- Ozenoxacin
- Spirotryprostatin B
- Nauclechine
- CID 91763610
- Cadamine
