= Erosive pustular dermatosis of the scalp =

- Other names: Erosive pustular dermatosis of the scalp
- Specialty: Dermatology

Erosive pustular dermatitis of the scalp presents with pustules, erosions, and crusts on the scalp of primarily older Caucasian females, and on biopsy, has a lymphoplasmacytic infiltrate with or without foreign body giant cells and pilosebaceous atrophy.

The exact cause of erosive pustular dermatitis of the scalp is unknown. Risk factors include actinic damage, epidermal atrophy, topical drugs and agent, surgery, and infections. Trauma and tissue injury are other potential triggers.

A skin biopsy can be used to help rule out potential differential diagnoses but histopathology is unspecific.

Treatment includes topical corticosteroids and topical tacrolimus 0.1% ointment.

== Signs and symptoms ==
Atrophic skin with a mixture of superficial erosions, crusts, and pustules is the characteristic clinical appearance of erosive pustular dermatitis of the scalp. There might be a wide range in the quantity of pustules, and occasionally none at all. They frequently didn't get better over several months or even years as they grew. Secondly, cicatrical alopecia may occur. It hurts not to have the lesions. Having pruritus is rare. It's a progressive course. There are no unplanned remissions.

== Causes ==
It's unclear what causes erosive pustular dermatitis of the scalp. It is believed that actinic damage and epidermal atrophy are risk factors. Many other factors, such as different topical drugs, infections, surgical operations, or topical agents, have been linked to the beginning of the illness; their direct role in the etiology is unknown.

Tissue injury and trauma are important erosive pustular dermatitis triggers. The following have been linked to erosive pustular dermatitis: preceding of herpes zoster, positioning of cochlear implants, iatrogenic injury from cryotherapy, topical chemotherapy, excisional surgery, imiquimod, grafting following nonmelanoma skin cancer surgery, topical methyl aminolevulinate photodynamic therapy, and carbon dioxide laser therapy.

== Diagnosis ==
The histopathology is unspecific and does not provide much support for the diagnosis. To rule out some differential diagnoses, though, which would require a different course of treatment, a biopsy is crucial. Subcorneal pustules, epidermal hypertrophy, or atrophy and erosions are seen in the histopathology.

== Treatment ==
Although there isn't a recognized treatment guideline for erosive pustular dermatitis of the scalp due to its rarity and unclear origin, topical treatments are typically the first line of treatment utilized. In order to limit permanent hair loss, therapy aims to reduce inflammation, cure erosions, and stop the progression of scarring alopecia. Treatment should begin as soon as feasible.

In the majority of documented cases, high-potency topical corticosteroids have been utilized with notable success and relative safety.

With comparable efficacy observed, topical tacrolimus 0.1% ointment has emerged as a viable substitute for topical steroids.

== See also ==
- Skin lesion
- Cicatricial alopecia
- List of cutaneous conditions
