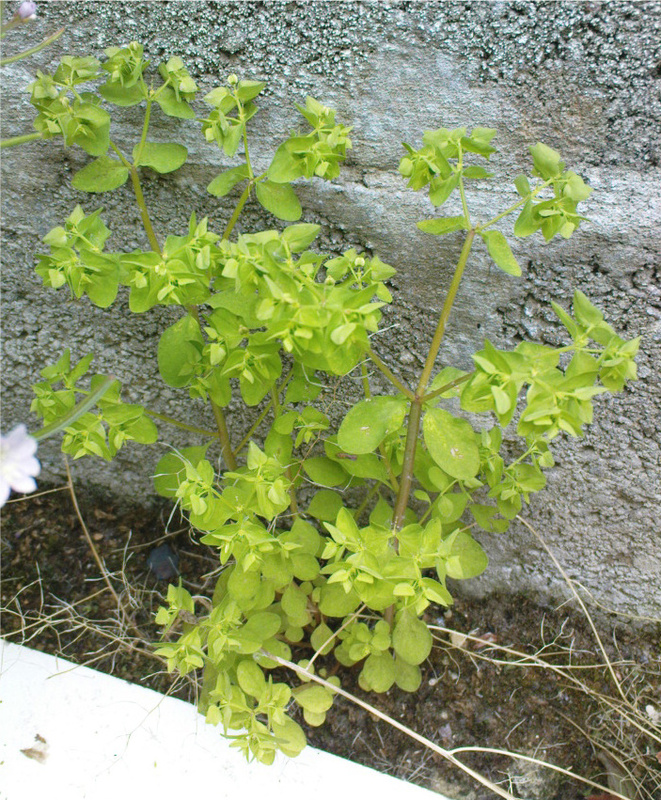

Scientific classification
- Kingdom: Plantae
- Clade: Tracheophytes
- Clade: Angiosperms
- Clade: Eudicots
- Clade: Rosids
- Order: Malpighiales
- Family: Euphorbiaceae
- Genus: Euphorbia
- Species: E. peplus

Binomial name
- Euphorbia peplus L.

= Euphorbia peplus =

Species of plant

Euphorbia peplus (petty spurge, radium weed, cancer weed, or milkweed), is a species of Euphorbia, native to most of Europe, northern Africa and western Asia, where it typically grows in cultivated arable land, gardens and other disturbed land.

Outside of its native range it is very widely naturalised and often invasive, including in Australia, New Zealand, North America and other countries in temperate and sub-tropical regions.

== Description ==
It is an annual plant growing to 5–30 cm (2–12 in) tall (most plants growing as weeds of cultivation tend towards the smaller end), with smooth hairless stems. The leaves are stalked, oval-acute, 1–3 cm (0.4–1.2 in) long, with untoothed margin. It has green flowers in three-rayed umbels. The glands typically of Euphorbia are kidney-shaped, and have long thin horns.

var. minima has stems low, ascending, branchy, leaves roundish, seeds smaller 1-1.4 mm (vs. 1.3-1.6 mm of var. peplus), predominantly countries on the north edge of the Mediterranean (PoWo Map)

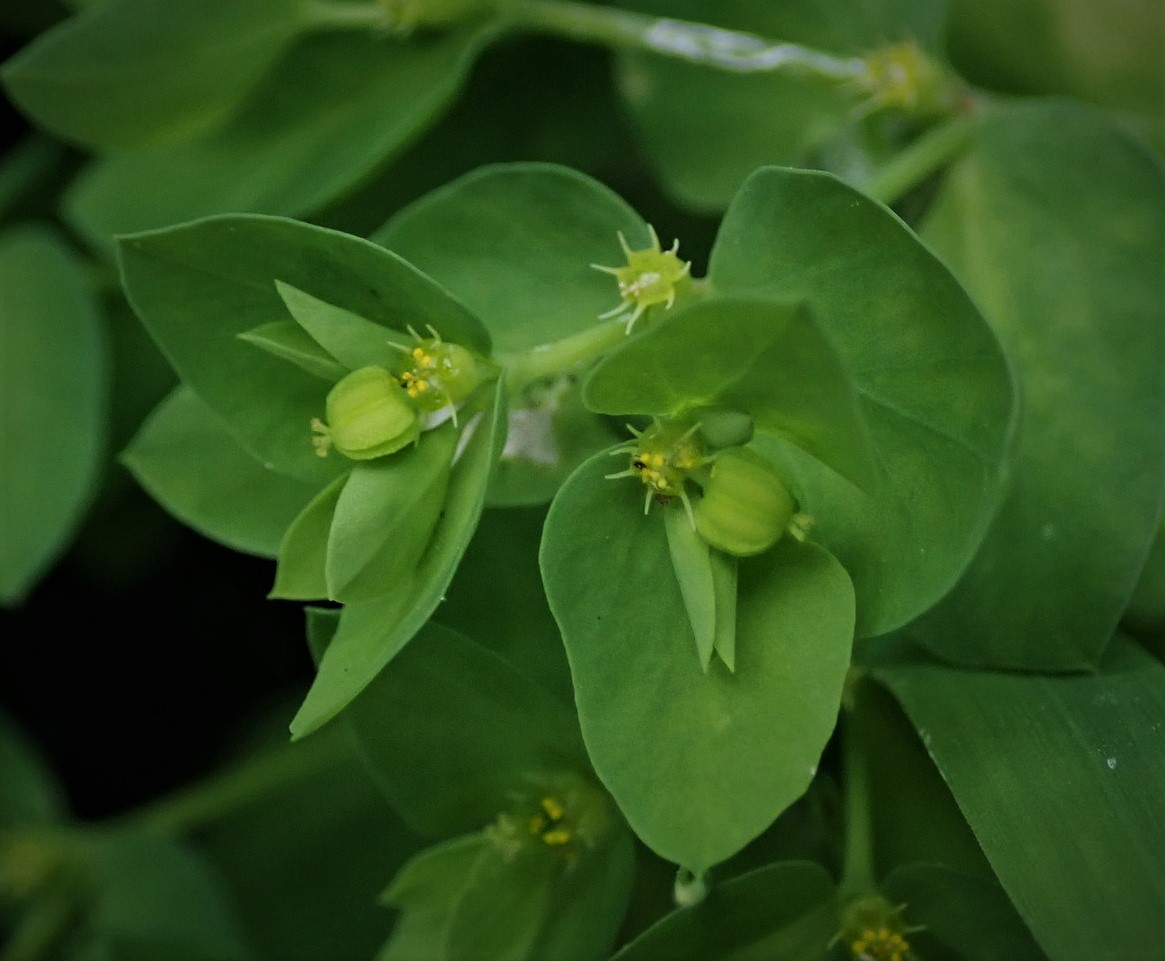
Euphorbia peplus cyathium

== Medicinal uses ==
The plant's sap is toxic to rapidly replicating human tissue, and has long been used as a traditional remedy for common skin lesions. The active ingredient in the sap is a diterpene ester called ingenol mebutate.

A pharmaceutical-grade ingenol mebutate gel has approval from the US Food and Drug Administration for treatment of actinic keratosis.

In Germany, recent studies have linked Euphorbia peplus with the virtual elimination of squamous cell skin cancer.

== Other uses ==
Euphorbia peplus was formerly eaten as famine food in Poland, the whole plant, including the root, being prepared by boiling in milk.
