= ATC code D06 =

ATC code D06 Antibiotics and chemotherapeutics for dermatological use is a therapeutic subgroup of the Anatomical Therapeutic Chemical Classification System, a system of alphanumeric codes developed by the World Health Organization (WHO) for the classification of drugs and other medical products. Subgroup D06 is part of the anatomical group D Dermatologicals.

Codes for veterinary use (ATCvet codes) can be created by placing the letter Q in front of the human ATC code: for example, QD06. ATCvet codes without corresponding human ATC codes are cited with the leading Q in the following list.
National versions of the ATC classification may include additional codes not present in this list, which follows the WHO version.

== D06A Antibiotics for topical use ==
=== D06AA Tetracycline and derivatives ===
D06AA01 Demeclocycline
D06AA02 Chlortetracycline
D06AA03 Oxytetracycline
D06AA04 Tetracycline
QD06AA52 Chlortetracycline, combinations
QD06AA53 Oxytetracycline, combinations
QD06AA54 Tetracycline, combinations

=== D06AX Other antibiotics for topical use ===
D06AX01 Fusidic acid
D06AX02 Chloramphenicol
D06AX04 Neomycin
D06AX05 Bacitracin
D06AX07 Gentamicin
D06AX08 Tyrothricin
D06AX09 Mupirocin
D06AX10 Virginiamycin
D06AX11 Rifaximin
D06AX12 Amikacin
D06AX13 Retapamulin
D06AX14 Ozenoxacin
D06AX15 Rifamycin
QD06AX99 Other antibiotics for topical use, combinations

== D06B Chemotherapeutics for topical use ==
=== D06BA Sulfonamides ===
D06BA01 Silver sulfadiazine
D06BA02 Sulfathiazole
D06BA03 Mafenide
D06BA04 Sulfamethizole
D06BA05 Sulfanilamide
D06BA06 Sulfamerazine
QD06BA30 Combinations of chemotherapeutics for topical use
D06BA51 Silver sulfadiazine, combinations
QD06BA53 Mafenide, combinations
QD06BA90 Formosulfathiazole
QD06BA99 Sulfonamides, combinations

=== D06BB Antivirals ===
D06BB01 Idoxuridine
D06BB02 Tromantadine
D06BB03 Aciclovir
D06BB04 Podophyllotoxin
D06BB05 Inosine
D06BB06 Penciclovir
D06BB07 Lysozyme
D06BB08 Ibacitabine
D06BB09 Edoxudine
D06BB10 Imiquimod
D06BB11 Docosanol
D06BB12 Sinecatechins
D06BB13 Berdazimer sodium
D06BB53 Aciclovir, combinations

=== D06BX Other chemotherapeutics ===
D06BX01 Metronidazole
D06BX02 Ingenol mebutate
D06BX03 Tirbanibulin

== D06C Antibiotics and chemotherapeutics, combinations ==
Empty group
