= Lentigo maligna =

- Other names: Lentiginous melanoma on sun-damaged skin'
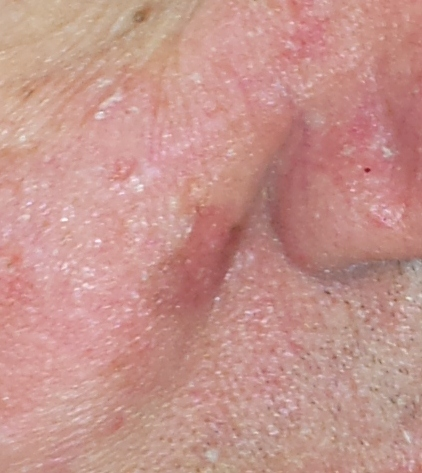
- Irregular patch about 10mm square after scrape biopsy which concluded "suspicious of early malignant melanoma". Colour before scrape biopsy was light brown. Post excision pathology was "Lentigo maligna - Melanoma in situ"
- Specialty: Dermatology

Lentigo maligna is where melanocyte cells have become malignant and grow continuously along the stratum basale of the skin, but have not invaded below the epidermis. Lentigo maligna is not the same as lentigo maligna melanoma, as detailed below. It typically progresses very slowly and can remain in a non-invasive form for years.

It is normally found in the elderly (peak incidence in the 9th decade), on skin areas with high levels of sun exposure like the face and forearms. Incidence of evolution to lentigo maligna melanoma is low, about 2.2% to 5% in elderly patients.

It is also known as "Hutchinson's melanotic freckle". This is named for Jonathan Hutchinson. The word lentiginous comes from the Latin for freckle.

== Relation to melanoma ==
Lentigo maligna is a histopathological variant of melanoma in situ. Lentigo maligna is sometimes classified as a very early melanoma, and sometimes as a precursor to melanoma.

When malignant melanocytes from a lentigo maligna have invaded below the epidermis, the condition is termed lentigo maligna melanoma.

== Signs and symptoms ==
Characteristics include a blue/black stain of skin initially. Skin is thin, about 4-5 cell layers thick, which is often related to aging. Histological features include epidermal atrophy and increased number of melanocytes.

== Diagnosis ==
First dilemma in diagnosis is recognition. As lentigo malignas often present on severely sun-damaged skin, it is frequently found amongst numerous pigmented lesions – thin seborrheic keratoses, lentigo senilis, lentigines. It is difficult to distinguish these lesions with the naked eye alone, and even with some difficulty using dermatoscopy. As the lentigo maligna is often very large, it often merges with, or encompasses other skin tumors – such as lentigines, melanocytic nevi, and seborrheic keratosis.

Second dilemma is the biopsy technique. Even though excisional biopsy (removing the entire lesion) is ideal, and advocated by pathologists; practical reason dictates that this should not be done. These tumors are often large and presenting on the facial area. Excision of such large tumor would be absolutely contraindicated if the lesion's identity is uncertain. The preferred method of diagnosis is by using a punch biopsy, allowing the physician to sample multiple full thickness pieces of the tumor at multiple sites. While one section of the tumor might show benign melanocytic nevus, another section might show features concerning for severe cellular atypia. When cellular atypia is noted, a pathologist might indicate that the entire lesion should be removed. It is at this point that one can comfortably remove the entire lesion, and thus confirm the final diagnosis of lentigo maligna. The size of the punch biopsy can vary from 1 mm to 2 mm, but it is preferable to use a punch 1.5 mm or larger. Representative samples of the most atypical parts of the nevus should be biopsied, often guided by dermatoscopy.

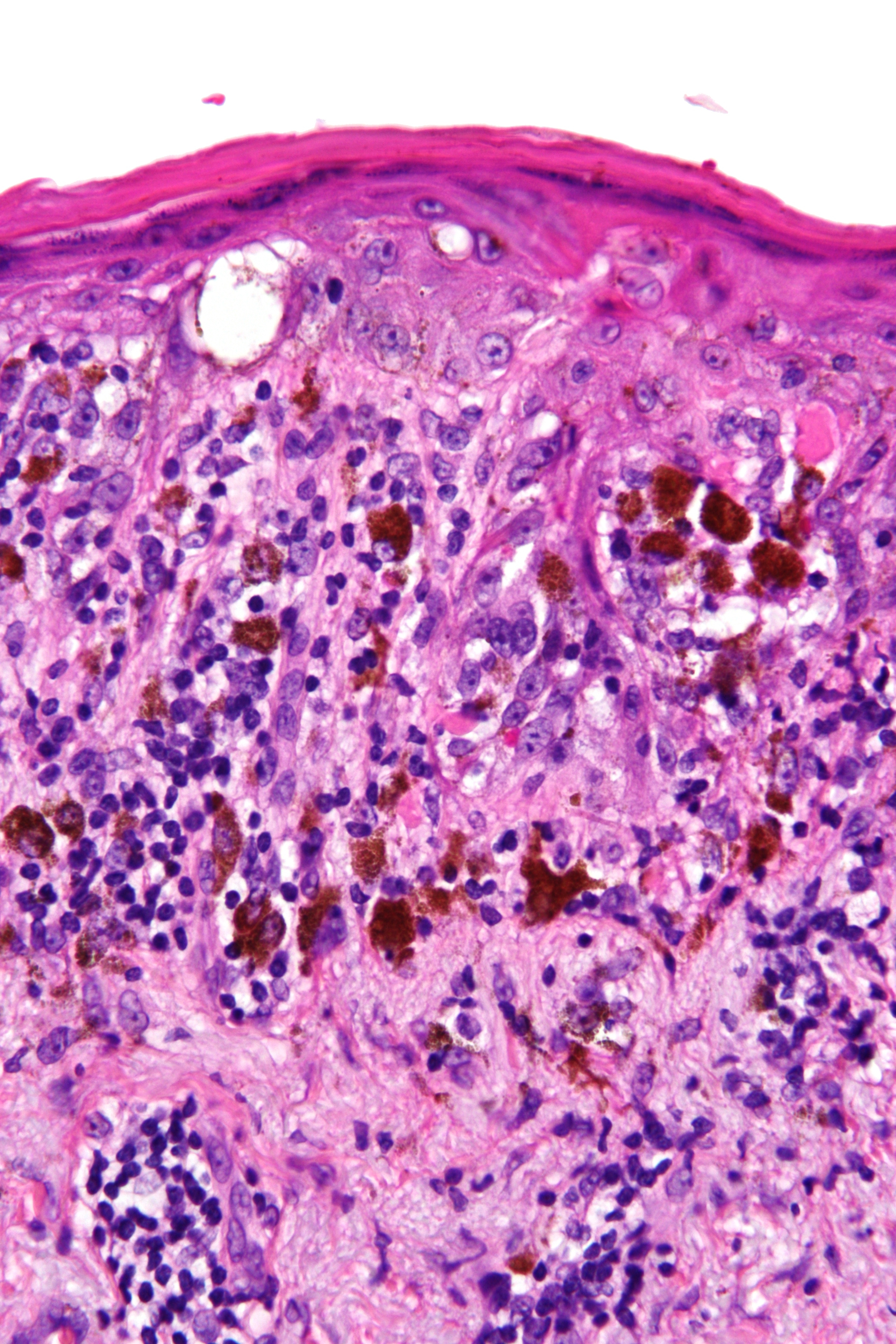
Light microscopy of lentigo maligna showing the characteristic atypical epidermal melanocytes. H&E stain.

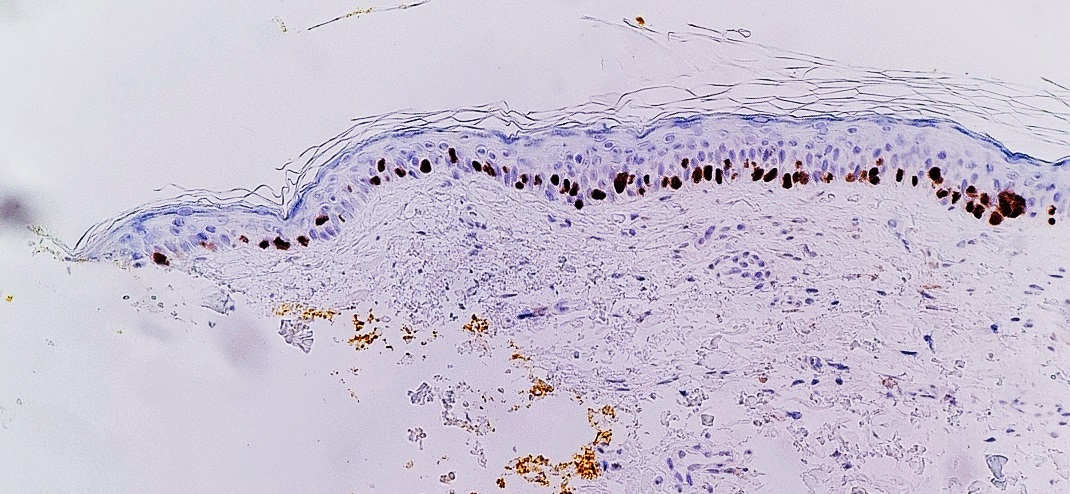
Immunohistochemistry with SOX10 (staining the cell nuclei of melanocytes) facilitates diagnosis of lentigo maligna, in this case showing an increased number of melanocytes along stratum basale of the skin, and nuclear pleomorphism. The changes are continuous with the resection margin (inked in yellow, at left), conferring a diagnosis of a not radically removed lentigo maligna.

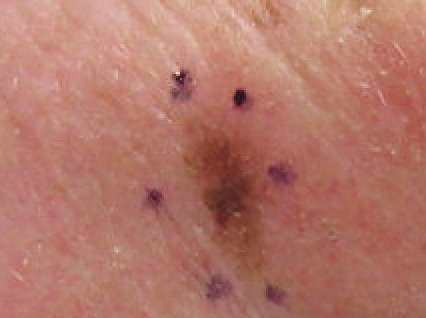
Lentigo Maligna Melanoma, Left Central Malar Cheek marked for biopsy

== Treatment ==
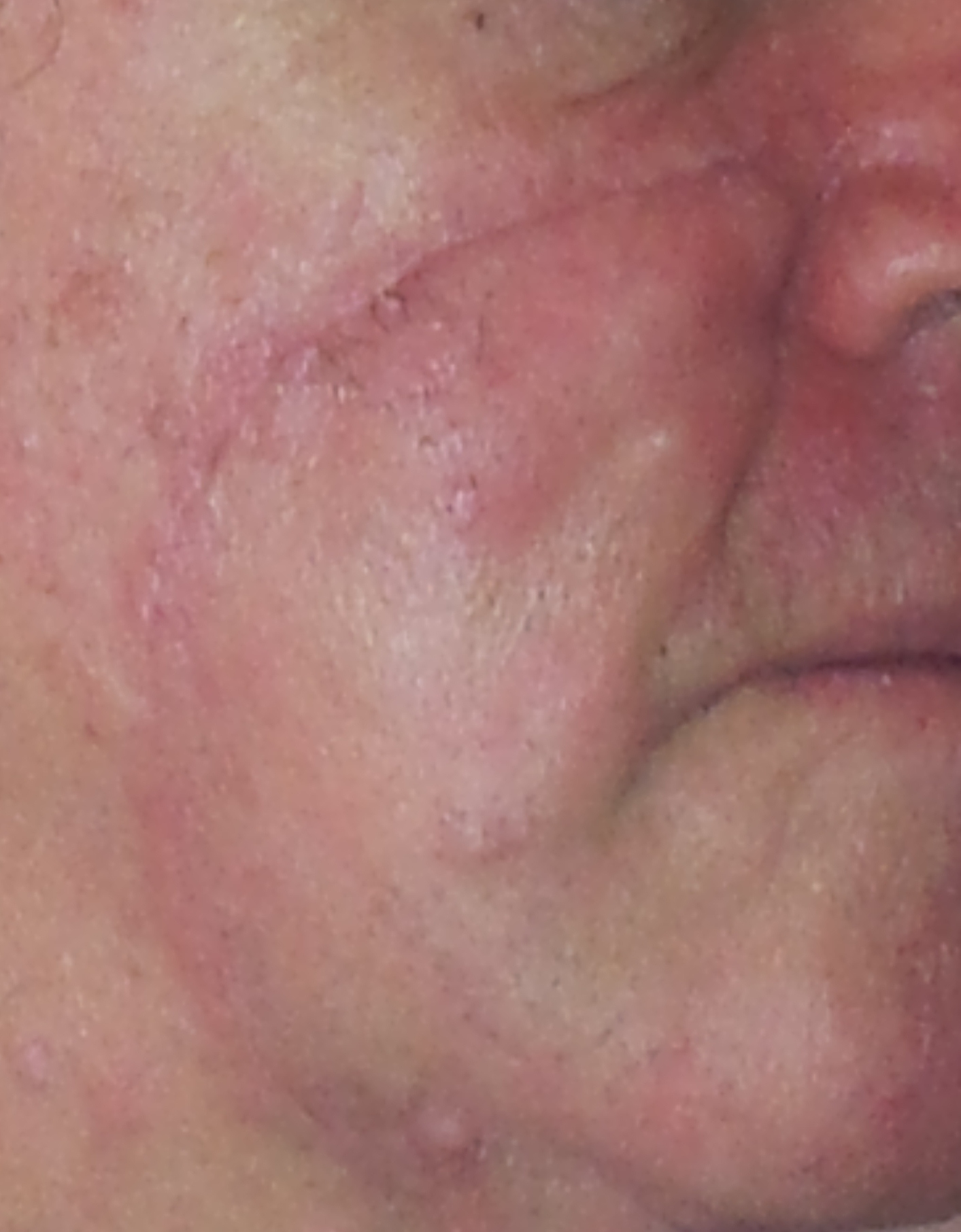
Scar 13 days after excision of coloured patch about 10mm square with 5mm margins from 1cm to right of base of nose. Length of incision required for skin flap to cover excision site. Scar should lighten and become finer for up to further 6 months if protected from sun.

The best treatment of lentigo maligna is not clear as it has not been well studied.

Standard excision is still being done by most surgeons. Unfortunately, the recurrence rate is high (up to 50%). This is due to the ill-defined visible surgical margin, and the facial location of the lesions (often forcing the surgeon to use a narrow surgical margin). The use of dermatoscopy can significantly improve the surgeon's ability to identify the surgical margin. The narrow surgical margin used (smaller than the standard of care of 5 mm), combined with the limitation of the standard bread loafing technique of fixed tissue histology - result in a high "false negative" error rate, and frequent recurrences. Margin controlled (peripheral margins) is necessary to eliminate the false negative errors. If breadloafing is utilized, distances from sections should approach 0.1 mm to assure that the method approaches complete margin control.

Where the lesion is on the face and either large or 5mm margins are possible, a skin flap or skin graft may be indicated/required. Grafts have their own risks of failure and poor cosmetic outcomes. Flaps can require extensive incision resulting in long scars and may be better done by plastic surgeons (and possibly better again by those with extensive LM or "suspicious of early malignant melanoma" experience.

Mohs surgery has been done with cure rate reported to be 77%. The "double scalpel" peripheral margin controlled excision method approximates the Mohs method in margin control, but requires a pathologist intimately familiar with the complexity of managing the vertical margin on the thin peripheral sections and staining methods.

Some melanocytic nevi, and melanoma-in-situ (lentigo maligna) have resolved with an experimental treatment, imiquimod (Aldara) topical cream, an immune enhancing agent. In view of the very poor cure rate with standard excision, some surgeons combine the two methods: surgical excision of the lesion, then three months treatment of the area with imiquimod cream.

Studies seem to conflict about the level of certainty associated with using imiquimod.

Another treatment to be considered where standard margins cannot be achieved or cosmetics are a major consideration is ultra-soft x-ray/grenz-ray radiation.

In the very elderly or those with otherwise limited life expectancy, the impact of major day surgery for excision with 5mm margins and large skin flap could be worse than doing nothing or the possibility of failed treatments with imiquimod or Grenz ray.
