= Ibacitabine =

Names
- IUPAC name 2′-Deoxy-5-iodocytidine
- Systematic IUPAC name 4-Amino-1-[(2R,4S,5R)-4-hydroxy-5-(hydroxymethyl)oxolan-2-yl]-5-iodopyrimidin-2(1H)-one

Identifiers
CAS Number	611-53-0
3D model (JSmol)	Interactive image
ChEMBL	ChEMBL2104340
ChemSpider	58561
ECHA InfoCard	100.009.337
KEGG	D07200
PubChem CID	65050
UNII	3EK8532DZV
CompTox Dashboard (EPA)	DTXSID50209985
- InChI: InChI=1S/C9H12IN3O4/c10-4-2-13(9(16)12-8(4)11)7-1-5(15)6(3-14)17-7/h2,5-7,14-15H,1,3H2,(H2,11,12,16)/t5-,6+,7+/m0/s1 Key: WEVJJMPVVFNAHZ-RRKCRQDMSA-N; InChI=1/C9H12IN3O4/c10-4-2-13(9(16)12-8(4)11)7-1-5(15)6(3-14)17-7/h2,5-7,14-15H,1,3H2,(H2,11,12,16)/t5-,6+,7+/m0/s1 Key: WEVJJMPVVFNAHZ-RRKCRQDMBC
- SMILES: OCC1[C@@H](O)C[C@@H](O1)N2C=C(I)C(N)=NC2=O

Properties
Chemical formula	C_{9}H_{12}IN_{3}O_{4}
Molar mass	353.11375

Pharmacology
ATC code	D06BB08 (WHO)
- Except where otherwise noted, data are given for materials in their standard state (at 25 °C [77 °F], 100 kPa). verify (what is ?) Infobox references

Ibacitabine (or ibacitabin, or 5-iodo-2'-deoxycytidine ) is an antiviral drug. It is topically applied to treat herpes labialis.
