= Berdazimer sodium =

Medication

Clinical data
- Trade names: Zelsuvmi
- Other names: SB206
- AHFS/Drugs.com: Monograph
- MedlinePlus: a624007
- License data: US DailyMed: Berdazimer sodium
- Routes of administration: Topical
- ATC code: D06BB13 (WHO)

Legal status
- Legal status: US: ℞-only

Identifiers
- CAS Number: 1846565-00-1
- DrugBank: DBSALT003491; DB18712
- UNII: ORT9SID4QY; B23P7SM943
- KEGG: D12758
- ChEMBL: ChEMBL4298064

Chemical and physical data
- Formula: Indeterminate
- Molar mass: Indeterminate

Berdazimer sodium, sold under the brand name Zelsuvmi, is a medication used for the treatment for molluscum contagiosum. Berdazimer sodium is a nitric oxide releasing agent. It is a polymer formed from sodium 1-hydroxy-3-methyl-3-(3-(trimethoxysilyl)propyl)-1-triazene-2-oxide and tetraethyl silicate.

The most common side effects occurred at the drug application site including pain, rash, itch, eczema, swelling, erosion, discoloration, blister, irritation, and infection. Other common side effects included fever, vomiting, and upper respiratory infections (common cold).

Berdazimer sodium was approved for medical use in the United States in January 2024. The US Food and Drug Administration (FDA) considers it to be a first-in-class medication.

== Medical uses ==
Berdazimer sodium is indicated for the topical treatment of molluscum contagiosum.

== Pharmacology ==
=== Mechanism of action ===
Berdazimer sodium is a nitric oxide releasing agent. The mechanism of action for the treatment of molluscum contagiosum is unknown.

== History ==
The US Food and Drug Administration (FDA) approved berdazimer sodium based on evidence from three clinical trials (NI-MC301, NI-MC302, and NI-MC304) of 1,598 participants with molluscum contagiosum. The trials were conducted at 121 sites in the United States. Among the 1,598 enrolled participants, all of them were evaluated for efficacy and 1,596 were evaluated for safety. In all three trials, participants with molluscum contagiosum were randomized to receive berdazimer sodium or vehicle applied to molluscum contagiosum lesions once daily for up to twelve weeks. Efficacy was assessed as the proportion of participants achieving complete clearance at week twelve. Complete clearance was defined as the subject having a total of molluscum contagiosum lesion count of zero at assessment. Trial 1 enrolled 891 participants, trial 2 enrolled 355 participants, and trial 3 enrolled 352 participants. Participants were randomized 1:1 in trial 1, and 2:1 in trials 2 and 3 to receive berdazimer sodium or vehicle applied to molluscum contagiosum lesions once daily for up to twelve weeks.

== Society and culture ==
=== Legal status ===
Berdazimer sodium was approved for medical use in the United States in January 2024.

=== Names ===
Berdazimer sodium is the international nonproprietary name.

Berdazimer sodium is sold under the brand name Zelsuvmi.

== Research ==
Berdazimer sodium is being investigated for acne vulgaris due to nitric oxide's ability to inhibit the NLRP3 inflammasome and C. acnes IL-1β activity, reducing inflammation. A phase 2 study demonstrated a significant reduction in non-inflammatory acne lesions compared to vehicle, but no significant improvement using the investigator global assessment (IGA) scores.
