= Graceway Pharmaceuticals =

American pharmaceutical company

Graceway Pharmaceuticals was a USA LLC based in Tennessee.

Products include:

- Aldara & Zyclara topical immune response modifier imiquimod
- Alu-Cap and Alu-Tab antacid aluminum hydroxide
- Atopiclair topical emollient
- Benziq topical acne agent benzoyl peroxide
- Benziq Wash topical acne agent benzoyl peroxide
- Calcium Disodium Versenate antidote edetate calcium disodium
- Disalcid salicylates salsalate
- Durable Barr topical emollient
- Estrasorb estrogen estradiol
- Maxair adrenergic bronchodilator inhaler pirbuterol
- Medihaler-Epi adrenergic bronchodilator, catecholamine, vasopressor epinephrine
- MetroGel-Vaginal anti-infective metronidazole
- Urex urine tract anti-infective methenamine
- Minitran antianginal vasodilator nitroglycerin
- Norflex, Norgesic Forte algesic and skeletal muscle relaxant orphenadrine
- Qvar corticosteroid inhaler beclomethasone
- Tambocor antiarrhythmicflecainide
- Theolair methylxanthine theophylline
- Titralac antacid calcium carbonate

Graceway declared bankruptcy in 2011 and its assets were purchased by Medicis Pharmaceutical Corporation of Scottsdale AZ.
