= Edoxudine =

Chemical compound

Clinical data
- ATC code: D06BB09 (WHO)

Legal status
- Legal status: In general: ℞ (Prescription only)

Identifiers
- IUPAC name: 5-ethyl-1-[4-hydroxy-5-(hydroxymethyl)oxolan-2-yl]pyrimidine-2,4-dione
- CAS Number: 15176-29-1
- PubChem CID: 66377
- DrugBank: DB13421
- ChemSpider: 59752
- UNII: 15ZQM81Y3R
- ChEMBL: ChEMBL318153
- CompTox Dashboard (EPA): DTXSID4045890
- ECHA InfoCard: 100.035.645

Chemical and physical data
- Formula: C_{11}H_{16}N_{2}O_{5}
- Molar mass: 256.258 g·mol^{−1}
- 3D model (JSmol): Interactive image
- SMILES: O=C/1NC(=O)N(\C=C\1CC)[C@@H]2O[C@@H]([C@@H](O)C2)CO
- InChI: InChI=1S/C11H16N2O5/c1-2-6-4-13(11(17)12-10(6)16)9-3-7(15)8(5-14)18-9/h4,7-9,14-15H,2-3,5H2,1H3,(H,12,16,17)/t7-,8+,9+/m0/s1; Key:XACKNLSZYYIACO-DJLDLDEBSA-N

Edoxudine (or edoxudin) is an antiviral drug. It is an analog of thymidine, a nucleoside.

It has shown effectiveness against herpes simplex virus.
