= Sulfamethizole =

Chemical compound

Clinical data
- AHFS/Drugs.com: Micromedex Detailed Consumer Information
- MedlinePlus: a682231
- ATC code: B05CA04 (WHO) D06BA04 (WHO) J01EB02 (WHO) S01AB01 (WHO) QJ01EQ02 (WHO)

Pharmacokinetic data
- Protein binding: 98–99%
- Elimination half-life: 3–8 hours

Identifiers
- IUPAC name: 4-amino-N-(5-methyl-1,3,4-thiadiazol-2-yl)benzene-1-sulfonamide
- CAS Number: 144-82-1
- PubChem CID: 5328
- DrugBank: DB00576
- ChemSpider: 5137
- UNII: 25W8454H16
- KEGG: D00870
- ChEBI: CHEBI:9331
- ChEMBL: ChEMBL1191
- CompTox Dashboard (EPA): DTXSID5023615
- ECHA InfoCard: 100.005.129

Chemical and physical data
- Formula: C_{9}H_{10}N_{4}O_{2}S_{2}
- Molar mass: 270.33 g·mol^{−1}
- 3D model (JSmol): Interactive image
- Melting point: 208 °C (406 °F)
- SMILES: O=S(=O)(Nc1nnc(s1)C)c2ccc(N)cc2
- InChI: InChI=1S/C9H10N4O2S2/c1-6-11-12-9(16-6)13-17(14,15)8-4-2-7(10)3-5-8/h2-5H,10H2,1H3,(H,12,13); Key:VACCAVUAMIDAGB-UHFFFAOYSA-N

Sulfamethizole is a sulfonamide antibiotic.
