= Methyl aminolevulinate =

Chemical compound

Clinical data
- AHFS/Drugs.com: Multum Consumer Information
- ATC code: L01XD03 (WHO)

Identifiers
- IUPAC name: Methyl 5-amino-4-oxopentanoate
- CAS Number: 33320-16-0
- PubChem CID: 157922
- DrugBank: DB00992
- ChemSpider: 13180320
- UNII: 585NM85KYM
- ChEMBL: ChEMBL1096562
- CompTox Dashboard (EPA): DTXSID3048570

Chemical and physical data
- Formula: C_{6}H_{11}NO_{3}
- Molar mass: 145.158 g·mol^{−1}
- 3D model (JSmol): Interactive image
- SMILES: O=C(CC(N)C(=O)OC)C
- InChI: InChI=1S/C6H11NO3/c1-4(8)3-5(7)6(9)10-2/h5H,3,7H2,1-2H3; Key:FLQHIIVXMKXKFT-UHFFFAOYSA-N

Methyl aminolevulinate (MAL) is a drug used as a sensitizer in photodynamic therapy. It is a prodrug that is metabolized to protoporphyrin IX. It is marketed as Metvix.

Metvix cream is applied topically and some time later the skin is illuminated with a proprietary red light (630 nm) source (medical lamp 'Aktilite') to activate the photosensitiser.

Metvix is developed by Photocure and Galderma has bought all rights to Metvix.

== Approvals and indications ==
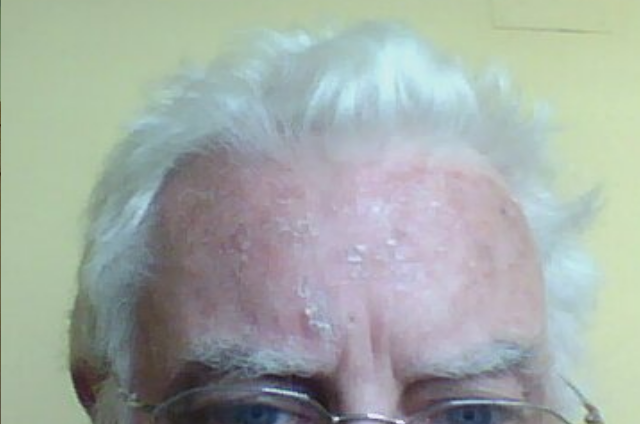
Interim result of phototherapy for actinic keratosis with Metvix one week after exposure. Patient has light skin and blue eyes.

Methyl aminolevulinate is approved in New Zealand for treatment of basal cell carcinoma.

It is now approved in many countries and has been used to treat non-melanoma skin cancer (including basal cell carcinoma).

It has some advantages over Levulan.

It has been reported as controversial in some quarters, with severe pain allegedly being experienced by some patients.
