= Ozenoxacin =

Chemical compound

Clinical data
- Pronunciation: oz en ox' a sin
- Trade names: Ozanex; Xepi
- AHFS/Drugs.com: Monograph
- MedlinePlus: a618010
- License data: US DailyMed: Ozenoxacin
- Routes of administration: Topical
- ATC code: D06AX14 (WHO)

Legal status
- Legal status: CA: ℞-only; US: ℞-only; EU: Rx-only

Identifiers
- IUPAC name: 1-Cyclopropyl-8-methyl-7-[5-methyl-6-(methylamino)-3-pyridinyl]-4-oxo-1,4-dihydro-3-quinolinecarboxylic acid
- CAS Number: 245765-41-7
- PubChem CID: 9863827
- DrugBank: DB12924
- ChemSpider: 8039521
- UNII: V0LH498RFO
- KEGG: D09544
- ChEBI: CHEBI:136050
- ChEMBL: ChEMBL3990047
- CompTox Dashboard (EPA): DTXSID00947446

Chemical and physical data
- Formula: C_{21}H_{21}N_{3}O_{3}
- Molar mass: 363.417 g·mol^{−1}
- 3D model (JSmol): Interactive image
- SMILES: O=C\3c1c(c(c(cc1)c2cc(c(nc2)NC)C)C)N(/C=C/3C(=O)O)C4CC4
- InChI: InChI=1S/C21H21N3O3/c1-11-8-13(9-23-20(11)22-3)15-6-7-16-18(12(15)2)24(14-4-5-14)10-17(19(16)25)21(26)27/h6-10,14H,4-5H2,1-3H3,(H,22,23)(H,26,27); Key:XPIJWUTXQAGSLK-UHFFFAOYSA-N

Ozenoxacin, sold under the brand names Ozanex and Xepi, is a quinolone antibiotic used for the treatment of impetigo. A 1% topical cream is approved for treatment of impetigo in Canada and in the United States.

Ozenoxacin is active against some bacteria that have developed resistance to fluoroquinolone antibiotics.

== Mechanism of action ==
Like other quinolone antibiotics, ozenoxacin targets DNA gyrase and topoisomerase IV.

Its activity against bacteria with fluoroquinolone resistance is attributed to its evasion of bacterial efflux pumps.

== Chemistry ==
=== Synthesis ===
Ozenoxacin is synthesized by the Pd-catalyzed cross-coupling of a bromoquinolone and a pyridyl tributylstannane (Stille coupling).

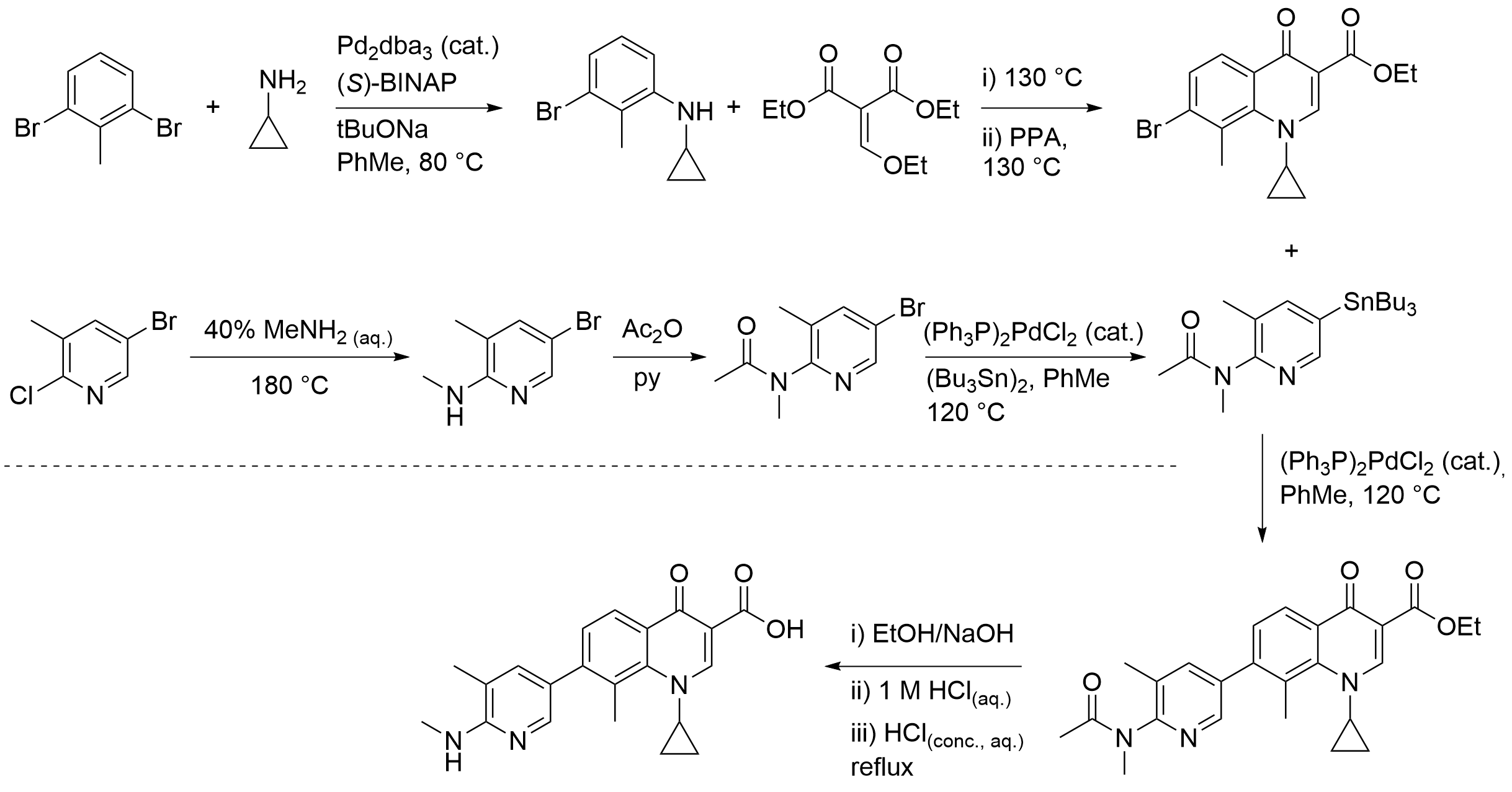
Synthesis of ozenoxacin

The pyridyl tributylstannane is synthesized from the corresponding dihalopyridine. This is achieved through a sequence of nucleophilic aromatic substitution with methylamine, which is protected as the acetamide using acetic anhydride and this is converted to the organostannane through a Pd-catalyzed stannylation with bis(tributyltin).

The bromoquinolone is made from the N-cyclopropyl aniline and diethyl ethoxymethylenemalonate, which react through a Michael addition, followed by elimination of the ethoxy group and then a Friedel-Crafts acylation at elevated temperature. The N-cyclopropyl aniline is prepared by a Pd-catalyzed cross coupling of 2,6-dibromotoluene and cyclopropylamine (Buchwald-Hartwig coupling).
