= Sulfathiourea =

Chemical compound

Clinical data
- Other names: (4-aminophenyl)sulfonylthiourea
- ATC code: J01EB08 (WHO)

Identifiers
- IUPAC name: 4-amino-N-(aminocarbonothioyl)benzenesulfonamide
- CAS Number: 515-49-1
- PubChem CID: 3000579
- ChemSpider: 2272143
- UNII: MXF9G4I1V5
- KEGG: D07239
- ChEBI: CHEBI:131723
- CompTox Dashboard (EPA): DTXSID4046868
- ECHA InfoCard: 100.007.457

Chemical and physical data
- Formula: C_{7}H_{9}N_{3}O_{2}S_{2}
- Molar mass: 231.29 g·mol^{−1}
- 3D model (JSmol): Interactive image
- SMILES: O=S(=O)(c1ccc(N)cc1)NC(=S)N
- InChI: InChI=1S/C7H9N3O2S2/c8-5-1-3-6(4-2-5)14(11,12)10-7(9)13/h1-4H,8H2,(H3,9,10,13); Key:UEMLYRZWLVXWRU-UHFFFAOYSA-N

Sulfathiourea is a sulfonamide antibacterial.
