= Shave biopsy =

Medical test procedure

Shave biopsy is a biopsy procedure in which a skin abnormality and a thin layer of surrounding skin are removed with a small blade for examination under a microscope. Shave biopsies are not effective in treating melanomas, but can provide a reasonably safe and accurate initial diagnosis. Surgical sutures are not needed with this procedure.
