= Mafenide =

Chemical compound

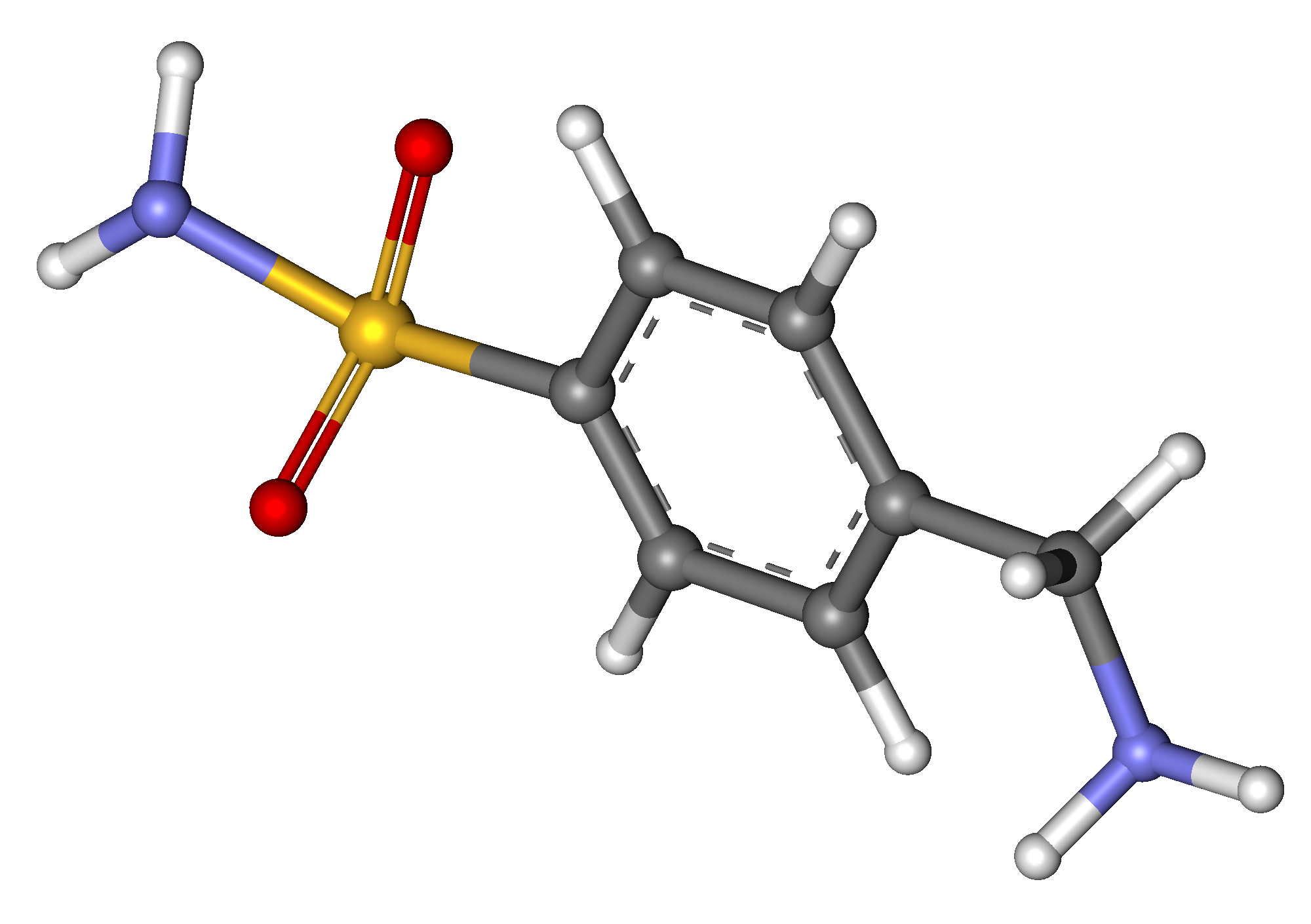

Clinical data
- Trade names: Sulfamylon, Mafylon
- AHFS/Drugs.com: Monograph
- Routes of administration: Topical
- ATC code: D06BA03 (WHO)

Legal status
- Legal status: In general: ℞ (Prescription only)

Identifiers
- IUPAC name: 4-(Aminomethyl)benzenesulfonamide
- CAS Number: 138-39-6
- PubChem CID: 3998
- DrugBank: DB06795
- ChemSpider: 3858
- UNII: 58447S8P4L
- KEGG: D02351
- ChEMBL: ChEMBL419
- CompTox Dashboard (EPA): DTXSID6047860
- ECHA InfoCard: 100.004.843

Chemical and physical data
- Formula: C_{7}H_{10}N_{2}O_{2}S
- Molar mass: 186.23 g·mol^{−1}
- 3D model (JSmol): Interactive image
- SMILES: O=S(=O)(c1ccc(cc1)CN)N
- InChI: InChI=1S/C7H10N2O2S/c8-5-6-1-3-7(4-2-6)12(9,10)11/h1-4H,5,8H2,(H2,9,10,11); Key:TYMRLRRVMHJFTF-UHFFFAOYSA-N

Mafenide (INN; usually as mafenide acetate, trade name Sulfamylon) is a sulfonamide-type medication used as an antibiotic. It was approved by the FDA in 1948.

== Uses ==
Mafenide is used to treat severe burns. It is used topically as an adjunctive therapy for second- and third-degree burns. It is bacteriostatic against many gram-positive and gram-negative organisms, including Pseudomonas aeruginosa. Some sources state that mafenide is more appropriate for non-facial burns, while chloramphenicol/prednisolone or bacitracin are more appropriate for facial burns.

== Mechanism of action ==
Mafenide works by reducing the bacterial population present in the avascular tissues of burns and permits spontaneous healing of deep partial-thickness burns.

== Adverse reactions ==
Adverse reactions can include superinfection, pain or burning upon application, rash, pruritus, tachypnea, or hyperventilation. Mafenide is metabolized to a carbonic anhydrase inhibitor, which could potentially result in metabolic acidosis.

== Drug interactions ==
There are no significant interactions.

== Contraindications ==
Mafenide is contraindicated in those with sulfonamide hypersensitivity or renal impairment.

== Dosage ==
For use as adjunctive therapy for second- and third-degree burns to prevent infection, adults and children should apply topically to a thickness of approximately 1.6 mm to cleaned and debrided wound once or twice per day with a sterile gloved hand. The burned area should be covered with cream at all times.
