= Enterography =

Enterography is medical imaging of the intestines. Thus it may refer to:

- Upper gastrointestinal series
- Lower gastrointestinal series
- CT Enterography
- MR Enterography

It usually refers to an upper gastrointestinal series, in which sense it is distinguished from colonography, a lower gastrointestinal series (whereas the broader sense is hypernymous to colonography).
