= Gastrointestinal series =

A gastrointestinal series, also called a GI series, is a radiologic examination of the upper and/or lower gastrointestinal tract.

- Upper GI series
- Lower GI series
