= CTE World (disambiguation) =

CTE New World is an American record label founded by Jay Wayne Jenkins.

CTE World may also refer to:

== Songs ==
Whole Wide World (Unpeeled), a single made by Cage The Elephant, released on June 22, 2017.

CTE (song), a single made by NEMS from the album America's Sweetheart (Deluxe), released on February 14, 2025.

== Artists ==
Cage The Elephant, commonly referred to by the acronym CTE in the rock fandom.

Cte Cam, a rapper of unknown origin.

== Organizations ==
Churches Together in England, a british Christian organization known for encouraging church togetherness world-wide, commonly referred to by the acronym CTE.

== See also ==
- Jeezy (U.S. rapper) of CTE World
- Category:CTE World albums
- CTE (disambiguation)
