= Carney triad =

Multiple neoplasia syndrome

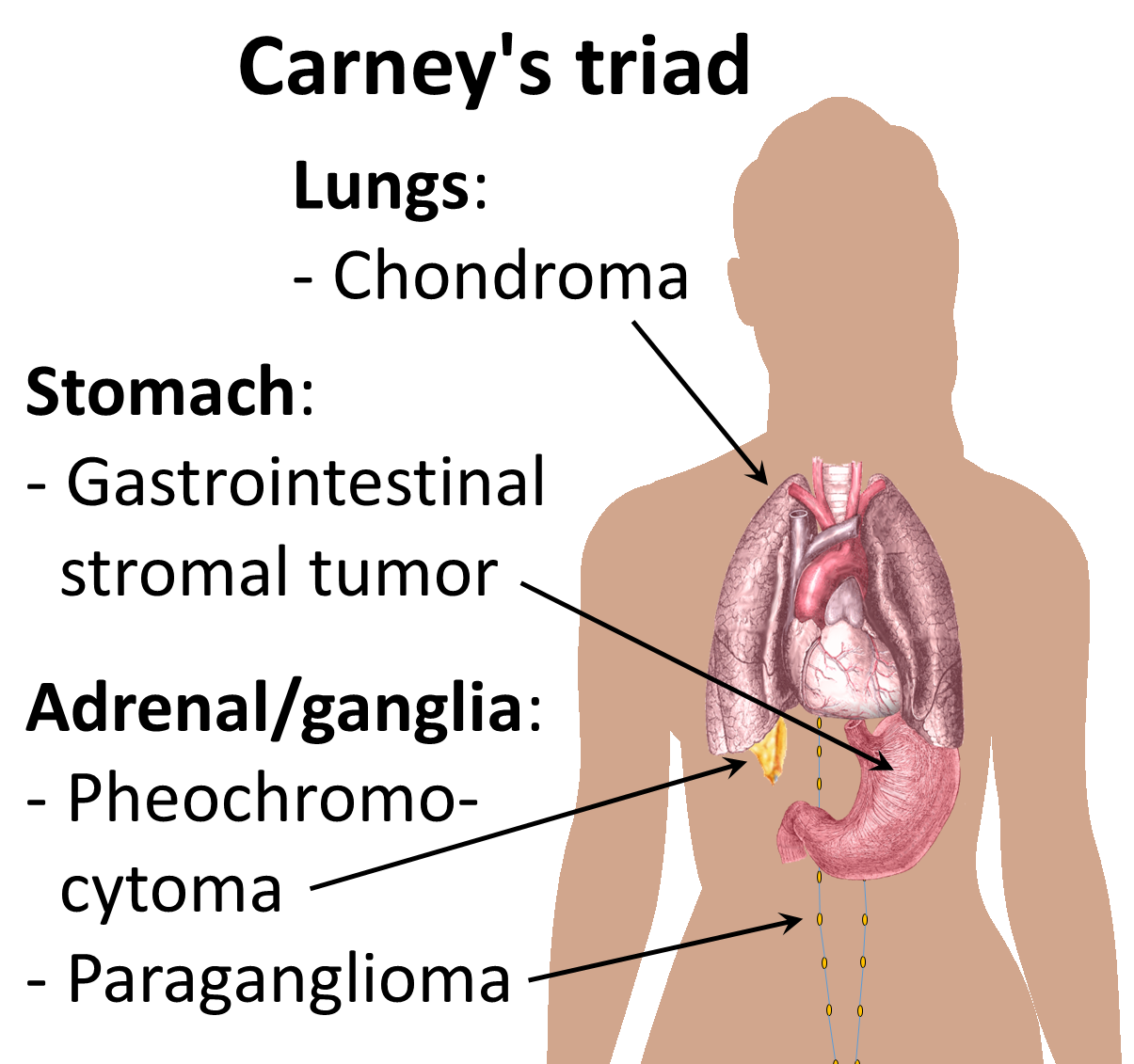

Carney triad (CT) is characterized by the coexistence of three types of neoplasms, mainly in young women, including gastric gastrointestinal stromal tumor, pulmonary chondroma, and extra-adrenal paraganglioma. The underlying genetic defect remains elusive. CT is distinct from Carney complex and Carney–Stratakis syndrome.

== Background ==
Carney triad (CT), named for J. Aidan Carney, is considered to be a specific type of multiple endocrine neoplasia (MEN). The three classically associated tumors are a subset of gastric epithelioid leiomyosarcoma (it is now known that this subset is actually gastrointestinal stromal tumor arising from the interstitial cells of Cajal), pulmonary chondroma, and extra-adrenal paraganglioma.

The condition manifests more commonly in females. Multiple tumors in multiple organs in young patients, with occasional sibling involvement, suggested an inherited disorder, but the underlying genetic basis has not been identified.

In addition to these three classical tumors, there is an increased incidence of pheochromocytoma, esophageal leiomyoma and adrenocortical adenoma.

The original description employed the then-prevailing terminology of gastric epithelioid leiomyosarcoma. Subsequent advances in molecular biology have led to the current terminology of gastrointestinal stromal tumors (GISTs). However, there is limited evidence to suggest that the gastrointestinal stromal tumors (GIST) in Carney triad lack CD117 (c-kit) mutations (i.e., they are wild-type), and hence these GISTs may prove unresponsive to Imatinib.

== Taxonomy ==
Carney triad is distinct from two other multiple neoplasia syndromes, also described by J. Aidan Carney.

=== Carney complex ===
The Carney complex is a distinct entity, characterized by myxomatous neoplasms (cardiac, endocrine, cutaneous and neural), and a host of pigmented lesions of the skin and mucosae, including the rarely occurring epitheloid blue nevus.

=== Carney–Stratakis syndrome ===
A third condition, the Carney–Stratakis syndrome (CSS), describes the dyad of hereditary gastrointestinal stromal tumor (GIST) and paraganglioma, that is caused by germline mutations in the mitochondrial tumor suppressor gene pathway involving the succinate dehydrogenase subunits SDHD, SDHC and SDHB.
