= J. Aidan Carney =

Irish-born American pathologist (1934–2024)

John Aidan Carney (January 31, 1934 – February 16, 2024) was an Irish-born American pathologist associated with the Mayo Clinic. He is best known for describing what became known as Carney syndrome, the separate condition of Carney triad, and Carney–Stratakis syndrome.

== Life and career ==
John Aidan Carney was born County Roscommon, Ireland on January 31, 1934. He graduated in medicine from University College Dublin in 1959, and interned at St. Vincent's University Hospital. After further work in Dublin he moved to the Mayo Clinic in 1962, becoming a consultant in surgical pathology there in 1966. His Ph.D. thesis in pathology at the University of Minnesota in 1969 was on the Morphology of Myosin and Thick Filament Diameter in Experimental Cardiac Hypertrophy.

Carney was married twice, but had no children. He died of congestive heart failure in Rochester, Minnesota, on February 16, 2024, at the age of 90.
