= Ecchondroma =

- Pronunciation: ek-on-droh-muh
- Specialty: Oncology

An ecchondroma is a subtype of chondroma that occurs within the subperiosteal layer. The term used to describe its growth is "ecchondrosis".
