= Blue nevus =

Type of melanocytic tumor

- Other names: Blue neuronevus, dermal melanocytoma, nevus coeruleus, nevus bleu
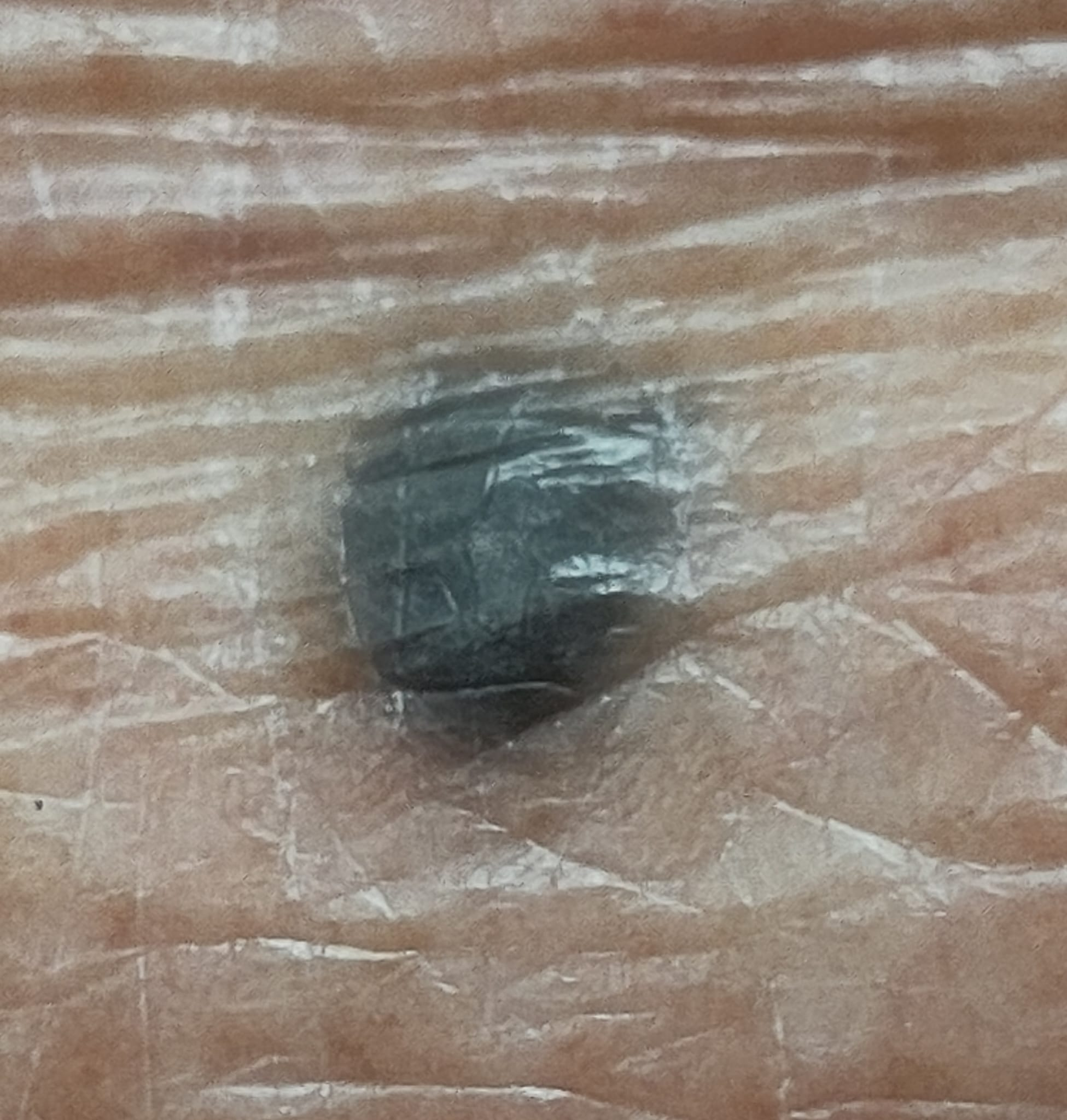
- Blue nevus
- Specialty: Dermatology
- Symptoms: Single well-defined blue-black bump
- Complications: Rarely malignant transformation
- Types: Dendritic, cellular
- Causes: Unclear
- Diagnostic method: Visualisation, dermoscopy
- Differential diagnosis: Dermatofibroma, melanoma
- Treatment: Monitoring, excision
- Prognosis: Good
- Frequency: Female>male

A blue nevus is a type of coloured mole, typically a single well-defined blue-black bump.

The blue colour is caused by the pigment being deep in the skin.

Diagnosis is by visualisation and dermoscopy. A biopsy is sometimes performed, or the whole lesion surgically removed. The outcome is generally good but there is a small chance of cancerous transformation. Differential diagnosis includes dermatofibroma and melanoma.

Blue nevi are more common in females than males. It was first studied in 1906 by Tièche, a student of Josef Jadassohn.

== Classification ==
Blue nevi may be divided into the following types:

- A patch blue nevus (also known as an "acquired dermal melanocytosis", and "dermal melanocyte hamartoma") is a cutaneous condition characterized by a diffusely gray-blue area that may have superimposed darker macules.
- A blue nevus of Jadassohn–Tièche (also known as a "common blue nevus", and "nevus ceruleus") is a cutaneous condition characterized by a steel-blue papule or nodule.
- A cellular blue nevus is a cutaneous condition characterized by large, firm, blue or blue-black nodules.
- An epithelioid blue nevus is a cutaneous condition most commonly seen in patients with the Carney complex.
- A deep penetrating nevus is a type of benign melanocytic skin tumor characterized, as its name suggests, by penetration into the deep dermis and/or subcutis. Smudged chromatic is a typical finding. In some cases mitotic figures or atypical melanocytic cytology are seen, potentially mimicking a melanoma. Evaluation by an expert skin pathologist is advisable in some cases to help differentiate from invasive melanoma.
- An amelanotic blue nevus (also known as a "hypomelanotic blue nevus") is a cutaneous condition characterized by mild atypia and pleomorphism.
- A malignant blue nevus is a cutaneous condition characterized by a sheet-like growth pattern, mitoses, necrosis, and cellular atypia.
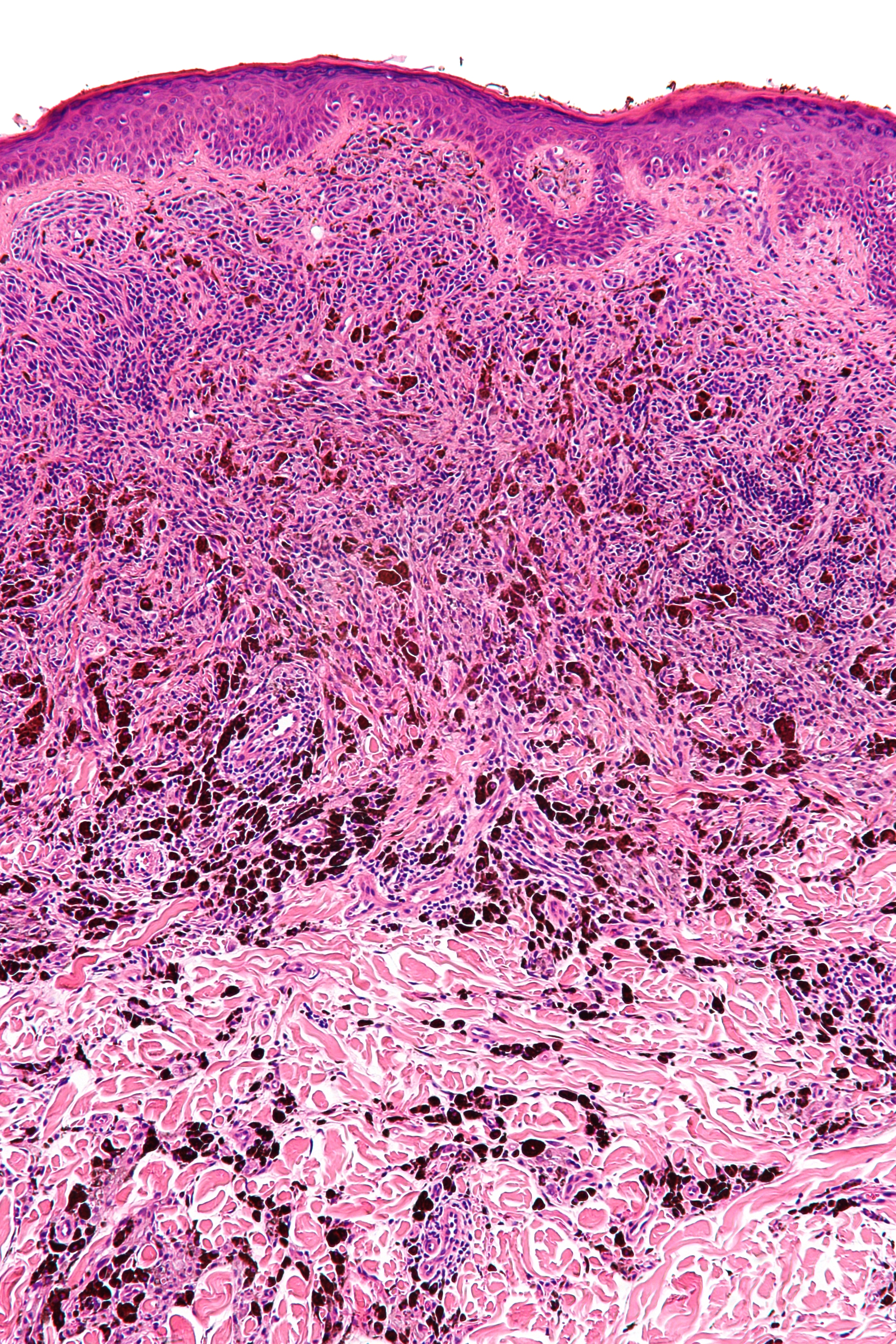
Micrograph of a blue nevus showing the characteristic pigmented melanocytes between bundles of collagen. H&E stain

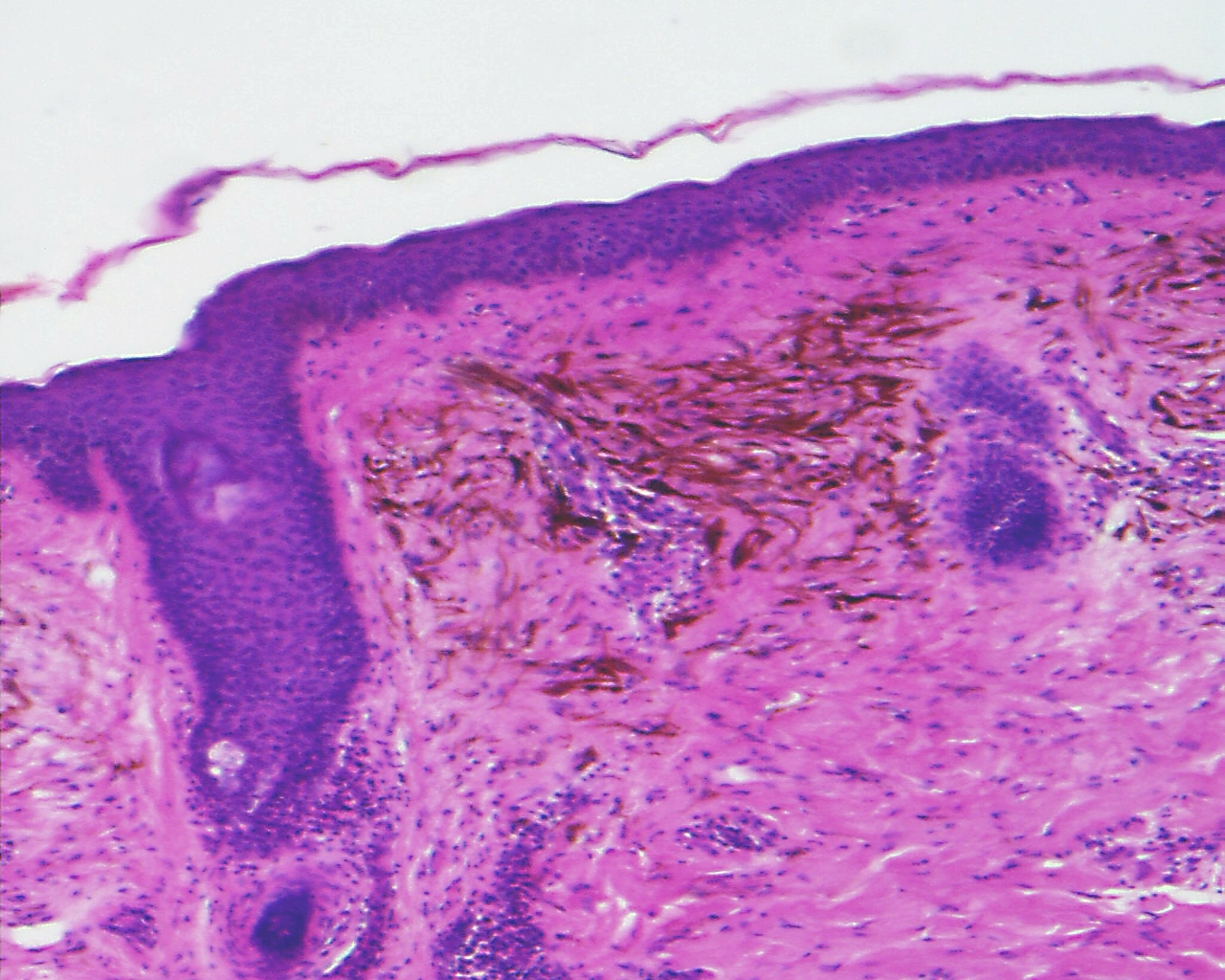
Blue nevus

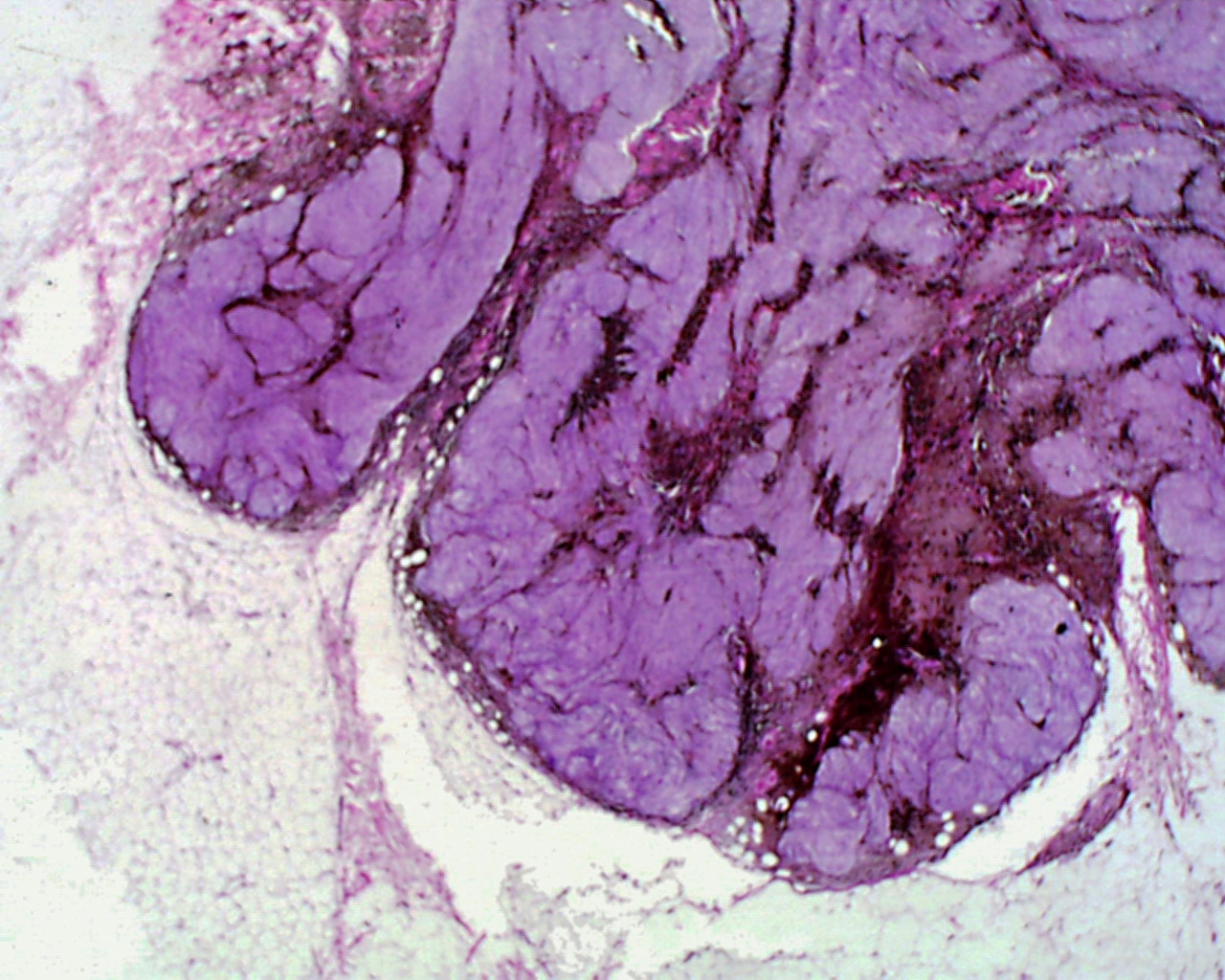
Cellular blue nevus

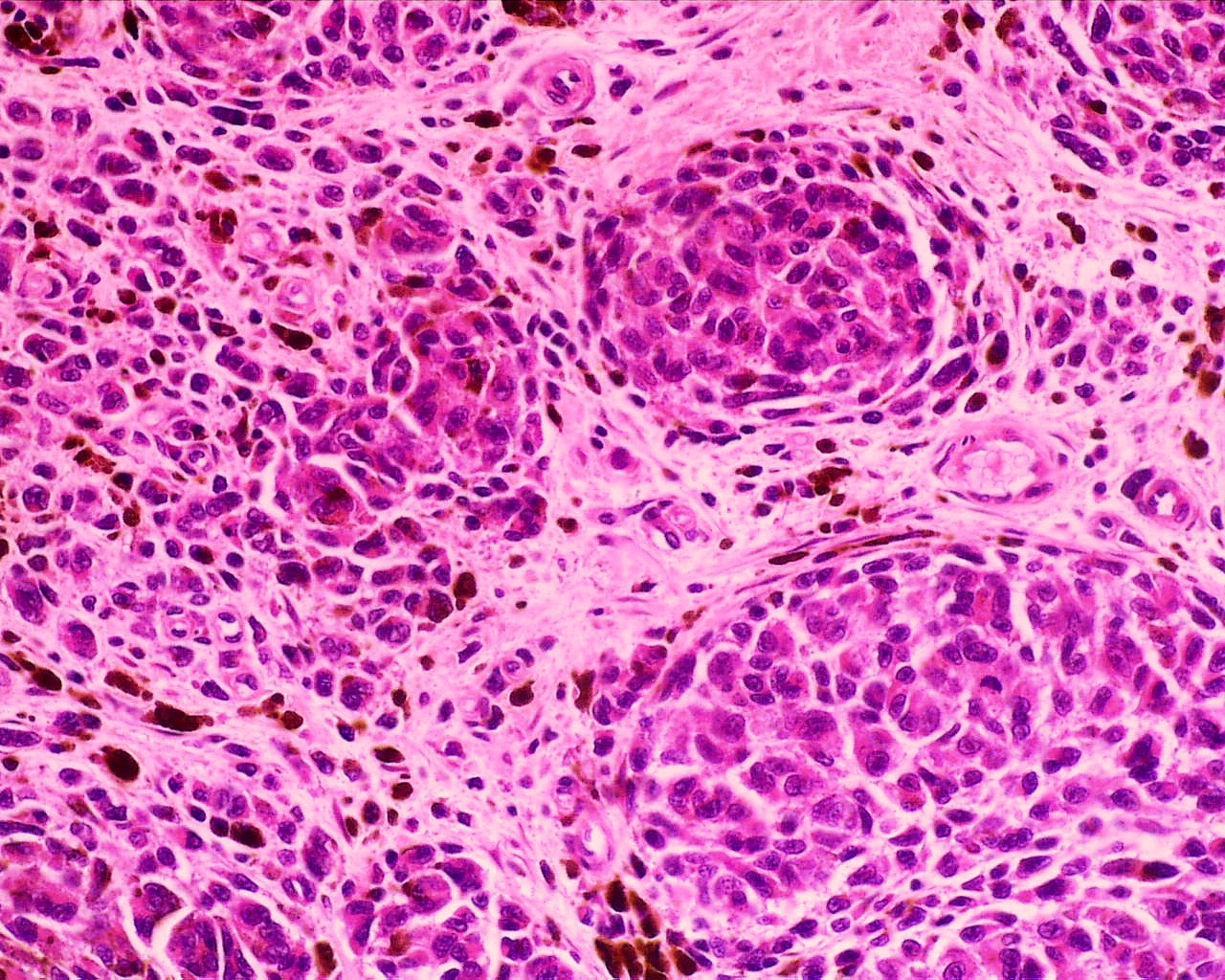
Epithelioid blue nevus

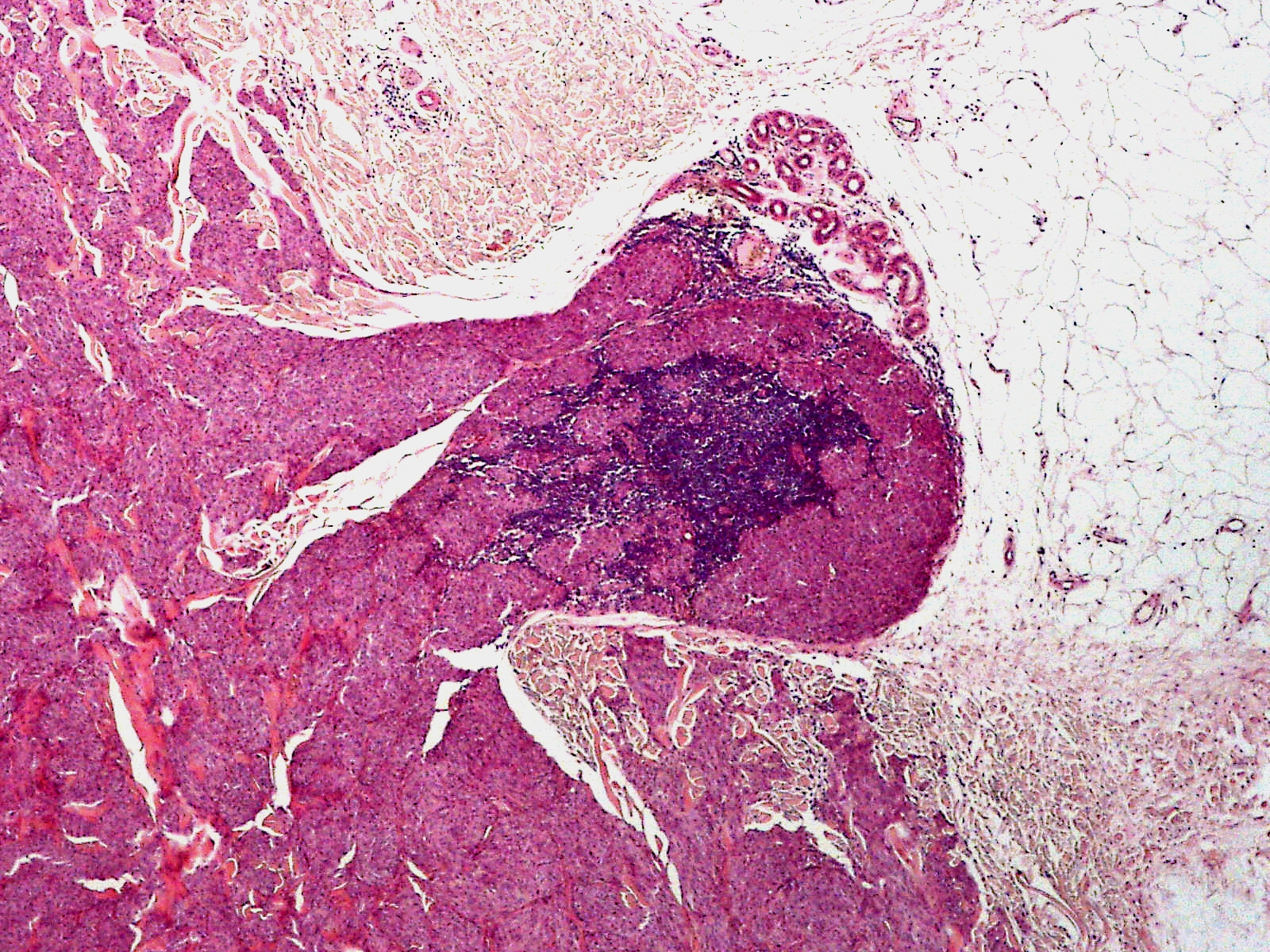
Malignant blue nevus

== See also ==
- List of cutaneous conditions
- List of genes mutated in pigmented cutaneous lesions
