= Extraskeletal chondroma =

- Other names: Chondroma of soft parts
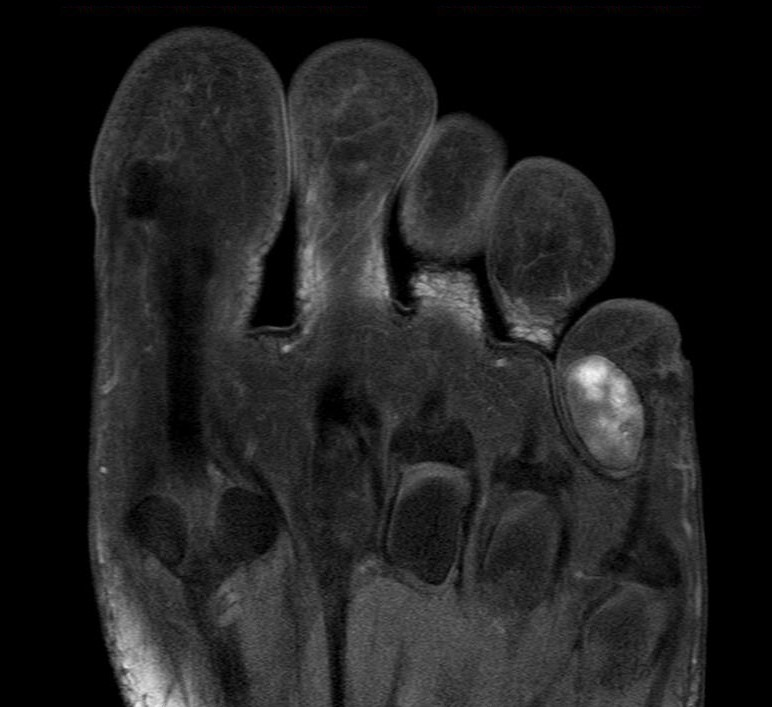
- Chondroma of the soft parts located in the little toe.
- Specialty: Dermatology

Extraskeletal chondroma is a cutaneous condition, a rare benign tumor of mature cartilage.

== Signs and symptoms ==
An extraskeletal chondroma often manifests clinically as a nodular soft tissue mass that steadily enlarges without discomfort and may exist for varying lengths of time before diagnosis. The fingers and toes are the most often affected areas. The tumor is oval in shape and clearly defined; it rarely has a diameter more than 3 cm.

== Causes ==
Rather of coming from mature osseous or cartilaginous tissue, it is believed that this tumor originates from the fibrous stroma of soft tissues. Micro trauma that occurs repeatedly could be the trigger.

== Diagnosis ==
A positive diagnosis can only be made through a histological analysis. An extraskeletal osteochondroma may show up on traditional radiography as a well-circumscribed, lobulated mass with intense core mineralization. The extraskeletal position of the mass can be verified by CT, which can also reveal foci of ossification or calcification that help narrow the diagnosis to extraskeletal chondroma. The most effective radiologic method is magnetic resonance imaging (MRI), which is able to characterize the tumor's extent, contour, shape, and intensity as well as its relationship to any calcifications or surrounding structures.

According to histopathology, the tumor has a lot of lobular structures and certain sections that resemble mucus-containing hyaline cartilage. Eosinophilic cells with a spindle or circular form are sparsely distributed throughout the tumor matrix. Tumor cells enlarge and take on a rounded appearance, resembling hyaline cartilage. Incomplete lacuna-like voids can occasionally occur in the surrounding matrix. In few circumstances, multinuclear cells and nuclear atypia are present in benign chondroma as well.

== Treatment ==
The only effective treatment is surgery, however recurrence is frequent.

== See also ==
- List of cutaneous conditions
