= Double-contrast barium enema =

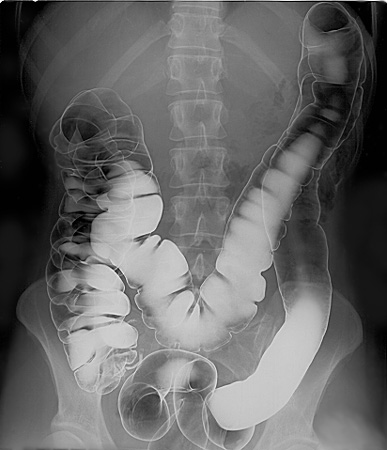
- Human intestinal tract, as imaged via double-contrast barium enema
- Purpose: radiography which uses 2 forms of contrast for better image

A double-contrast barium enema is a form of contrast radiography in which x-rays of the colon and rectum are taken using two forms of contrast to make the structures easier to see. A liquid containing barium (that is, a radiocontrast agent) is put into the rectum. Barium (usually as a sulfate) outlines the colon and rectum on an x-ray and helps show abnormalities. Air is also put into the rectum and colon to further enhance the x-ray.

Double-contrast barium enemas are less invasive than a colonoscopy and have comparatively fewer issues in a viable large bowel.

== See also ==
- Contrast agent
- Lower gastrointestinal series
