= Computed tomography enterography =

Medical imaging technique

CT enterography
- Specialty: Radiology

Computed tomography enterography (CT enterography, CTE) is a medical imaging technique which uses computed tomography scanner and contrast media to examine the small bowel. It was first introduced by Raptopoulos et al. in 1997. CT Enterography can be used to assess a variety of problems involving the small bowel, however it is mainly used to diagnose and assess severity of Crohn's disease.

CT enterography should not be confused with CT enteroclysis. In CT enterography contrast media is given orally, and in CT enteroclysis contrast media is administered through a fluoroscopy-guided positioned nasojejunal tube.

== Advantages ==
CTE provides enough distention of the bowel not present during normal CT imaging to increase the ability to examine in lumen and internal lining of the small intestines. When the small bowel is not properly distended it can be difficult to see if there is a problem in that area. CTE also provides better visualization of extraenteric findings, as well as acute inflammation, of Crohn's disease. These extraenteric findings include, but no limited to, fistulas and abscesses. Additionally, compared with CT enteroclysis, the patient does not need to be sedated for CTE nor requires the invasive step of placing the nasojejunal tube.

== Disadvantages ==
While CTE's main use is in the diagnosis and follow up in Crohn's disease, many of the findings on Crohn's disease found on CTE can be caused by a wide variety of other conditions. Spasm and collapse of the small intestine, which can happen in Crohn's disease, can obscure imaging of that portion of the bowel even with CTE.

== Indications ==
- Suspected small bowel bleeding in a hemodynamically stable patient
- Crohn's disease
  - Initially evaluation and follow up
- Unexplained diarrhea
- Small Bowel masses
  - Malignant
    - Adenocarcinoma
    - Carcinoid
    - Lymphoma
    - Gastrointestinal stromal tumor
  - Non-malignant
    - Hyperplastic polyps
    - Hamartomatous polyps sencondary to Peutz–Jeghers syndrome
    - Adenomas
    - Lipomas
    - Hemangiomas
    - Ectopic gastric or pancreatic tissue
    - Meckel's diverticulum

== Protocol ==
At least four hours of no intake of solid foods, patient may have clear liquids. Metoclopramide (Reglan) will be administered to assist with emptying the stomach and increase movement through the small intestines. Large amounts of an oral contrast agent are given to the patient. Neutral contrast agents are preferred over positive contrast agents such as barium. The neutral agents are vitally important for the effective visualization of the lining of the small intestine. Use of positive contrast agents could make it difficult to see any inflammation in the lining. Neutral agents include water, EG electrolyte solution, sugar alcohols, and methylcellulose. Patients are usually able to drink the large of amounts of these agents required for the study without major difficulty. This step is given at increments of 0, 20, 40, and 55 minutes after Reglan dose. Glucagon is given to patient five minutes before they enter the CT scanner to counter act the previous medication and attempt to slow down bowel activity. Intravenous contrast is also given when the patient is on the scanner. The patient will then enter the scanner for the image to be captured.

== Use in Crohn's Disease ==
CTE is preferred for the examination of Crohn's disease due to its increased spatial resolution and better ability to examine the wall of the small intestine than traditional CT studies of the abdomen and pelvis. Findings on CTE that indicate active inflammation in the small bowel, possibly caused by Crohn's disease, include:

- Mural hyperenhancement
- Mural stratification
- Thickening of bowel wall
- Mesenteric fat stranding
- Enlarged vasa recta

CTE is also used in examining if bowel inflammation improves after therapy and if the disease is progressing in a concerning way.

== Contraindications and special considerations ==
- Pregnancy
- Bowel obstruction
- Magnetic Resonance Enterography if that patient has a history of many CT scans previously
- CT of abdomen and pelvis if unable to tolerate oral contrast

== See also ==
- MR enterography
- Upper gastrointestinal series
