= CTE =

CTE may refer to:

== Arts, entertainment, media ==
- Celestial Tiger Entertainment, formerly Tiger Gate Entertainment, a Hong Kong based company that operates pay television channels
- Central Television Enterprises, formerly Central Independent Television's international distributor, a predecessor of ITV Studios
- Cross Technological Enterprises, a fictional high-tech firm in the Marvel Comics universe
- CTE World (Corporate Thugz Entertainment), the record label of rapper Young Jeezy

== Education ==
- Career and technical education, programs of study primarily in high school generally intended to prepare students for vocational success (US)

== Medicine ==
- Chronic traumatic encephalopathy, a neurological disorder observed in people with repeated brain trauma
- Computed tomography enterography, a medical imaging technique

== Organizations ==
- Churches Together in England, the national ecumenical instrument for churches in England
- Confederación de Trabajadores del Ecuador, a trade union centre in Ecuador

== Science, computing, risk management ==
- Coefficient of thermal expansion, in thermal mechanics
- Common table expression, a temporary named result set derived from a simple query in SQL
- Conditional tail expectation, a valuation of risk management and insurance liability
- Chunked transfer encoding, a streaming data transfer mechanism in HTTP

== Transportation ==
- Central Expressway, Singapore, a major highway
- Compañía Transatlántica Española, a defunct Spanish passenger ocean line also called "The Spanish Line"
- Cartí Airport in mainland Panama serving the Cartí Islands of the San Blas Islands (IATA code "CTE")
- Air Tenglong, a defunct airline in China (ICAO airline designator "CTE")
- CTE3, Havre Saint-Pierre Water Aerodrome, in Quebec, Canada
- CTE5, Lac à la Perchaude Airport, a defunct airport in Quebec, Canada

== Other ==
- Critical Technology Element, assessed during an Analysis of Alternatives, a requirement of military acquisition policy in the US
- CTE Racing-HVM, former name of auto racing team Racing-HVM
