= Spindle cell =

In neurobiology, spindle cell refers to:

- Spindle neuron, also known as a von Economo neuron

In general medicine, a spindle cell may refer to the spindle-shaped cells that are found in certain types of tumor:

- Inflammatory fibroid polyp
- Pigmented spindle cell nevus
- Spindle cell carcinoma
- Spindle cell lipoma
- Spindle cell sarcoma

== See also ==
- Spindle apparatus (part of a cell)
