= Chondroma =

Benign cartilaginous tumor

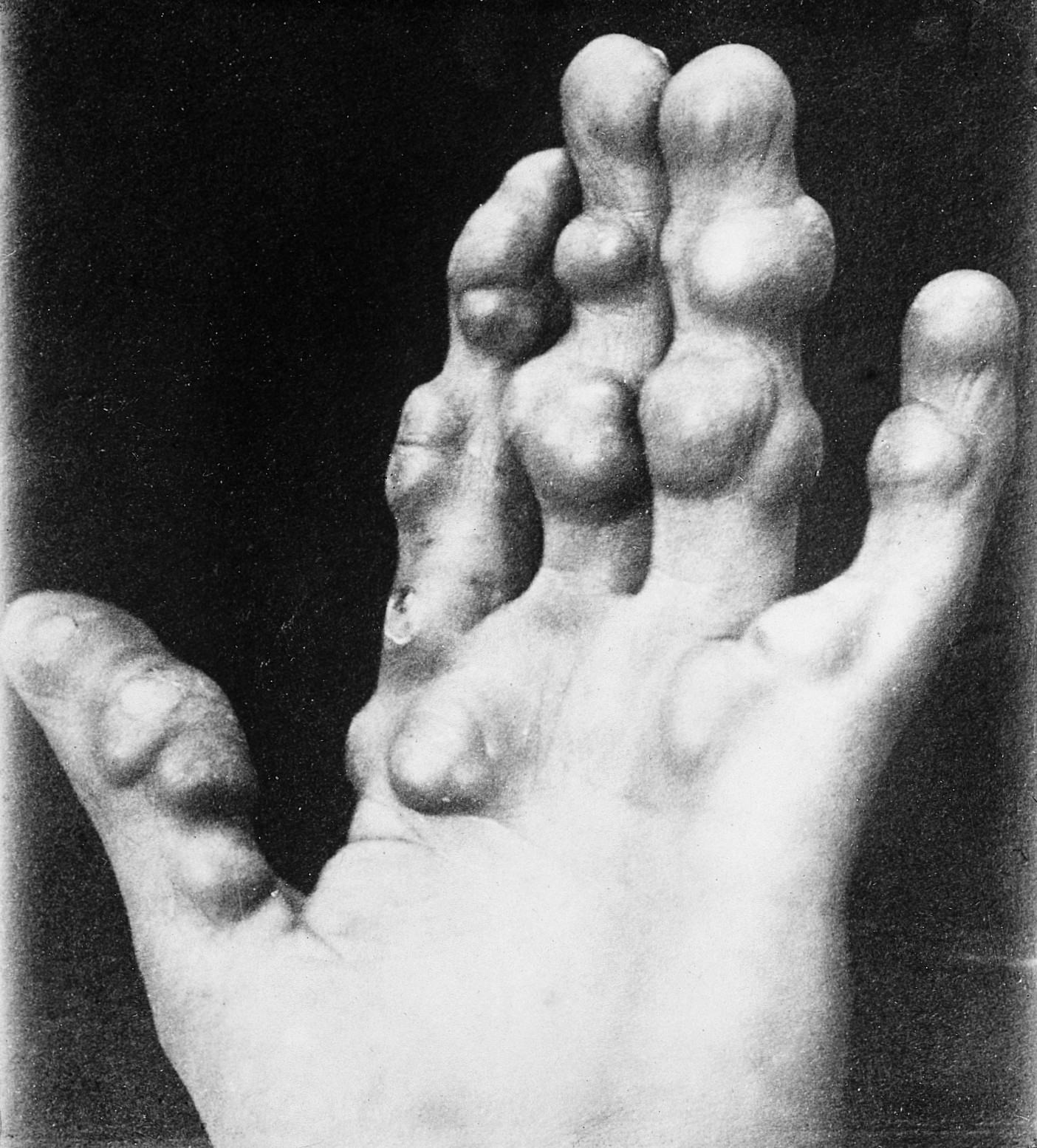
- Multiple chondromata of fingers
- Specialty: Oncology

A chondroma is a benign cartilaginous tumor, which is encapsulated with a lobular growing pattern.

Tumor cells (chondrocytes, cartilaginous cells) resemble normal cells and produce the cartilaginous matrix (amorphous, basophilic material).

== Presentation ==
Characteristic features of this tumor include the vascular axes within the tumor, which make the distinction with normal hyaline cartilage.

== Diagnosis ==
=== Classification ===
Based upon location, a chondroma can be described as an enchondroma or ecchondroma.

- enchondroma - tumor grows within the bone and expands it
- ecchondroma - grows outward from the bone (rare)

== See also ==
- Extraskeletal chondroma
