= Upper gastrointestinal series =

Radiographs used to examine abnormalities of the digestive system excluding the colon

- Normal barium swallow fluoroscopic image, showing the ingested barium sulfate being induced down the oesophagus by peristalsis.
- Synonyms: Upper gastrointestinal study, contrast radiography of the upper gastrointestinal tract, barium swallow, barium meal
- ICD-10-PCS: GroupMajor.minor

An upper gastrointestinal series, also called a barium swallow, barium study, or barium meal, is a series of radiographs used to examine the gastrointestinal tract for abnormalities. A contrast medium, usually a radiocontrast agent such as barium sulfate mixed with water, is ingested or instilled into the gastrointestinal tract, and X-rays are used to create radiographs of the regions of interest. The barium enhances the visibility of the relevant parts of the gastrointestinal tract by coating the inside wall of the tract and appearing white on the film. This in combination with other plain radiographs allows for the imaging of parts of the upper gastrointestinal tract such as the pharynx, larynx, esophagus, stomach, and small intestine such that the inside wall lining, size, shape, contour, and patency are visible to the examiner. With fluoroscopy, it is also possible to visualize the functional movement of examined organs such as swallowing, peristalsis, or sphincter closure. Depending on the organs to be examined, barium radiographs can be classified into "barium swallow", "barium meal", "barium follow-through", and "enteroclysis" ("small bowel enema"). To further enhance the quality of images, air or gas is sometimes introduced into the gastrointestinal tract in addition to barium, and this procedure is called double-contrast imaging. In this case the gas is referred to as the negative contrast medium. Traditionally the images produced with barium contrast are made with plain-film radiography, but computed tomography is also used in combination with barium contrast, in which case the procedure is called "CT enterography".

== Types ==
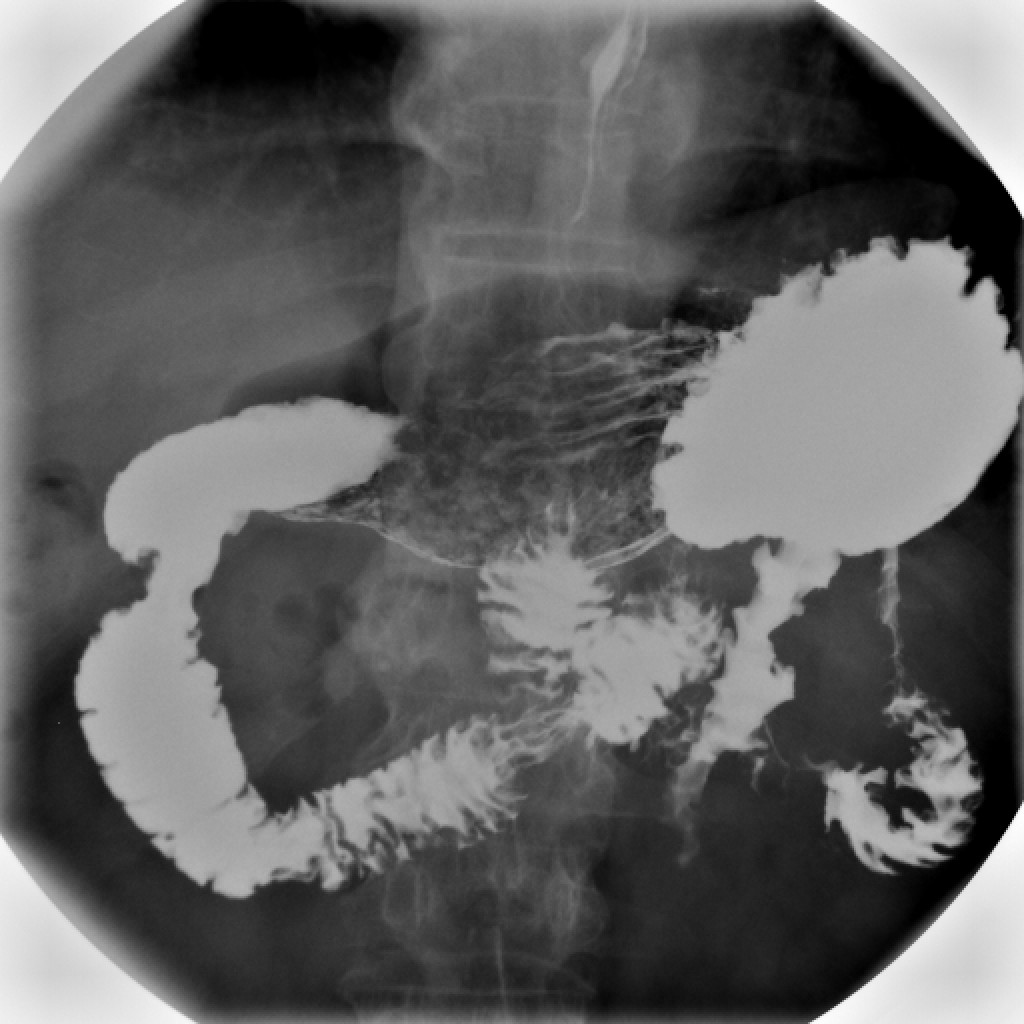
Barium meal examination showing the stomach and duodenum in double contrast technique with CO2 as negative contrast medium

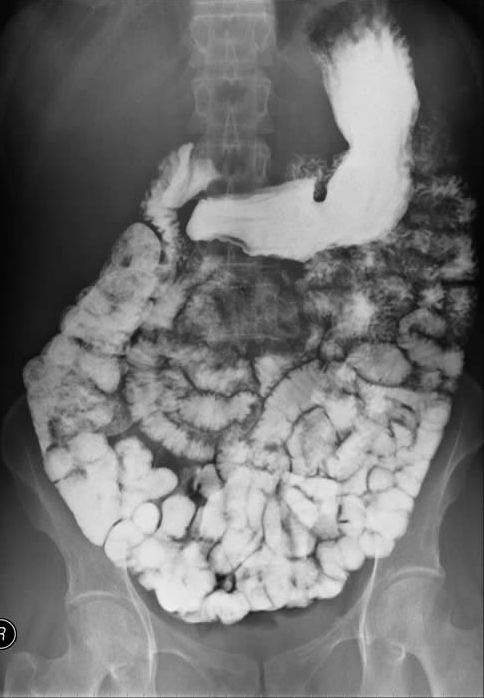
Barium follow-through showing the small bowel

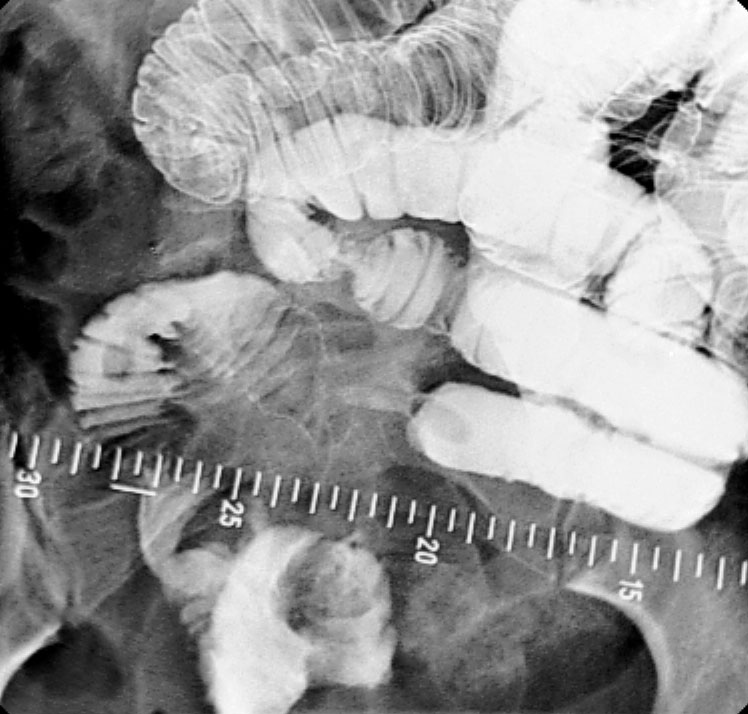
Enteroclysis in double contrast technique showing stenosis of the small intestine

Various types of barium X-ray examinations are used to examine different parts of the gastrointestinal tract. These include barium swallow, barium meal, barium follow-through, and barium enema. The barium swallow, barium meal, and barium follow-through are together also called an upper gastrointestinal series (or study), whereas the barium enema is called a lower gastrointestinal series (or study). In upper gastrointestinal series examinations, the barium sulfate is mixed with water and swallowed orally, whereas in the lower gastrointestinal series (barium enema), the barium contrast agent is administered as an enema through a small tube inserted into the rectum.

- Barium swallow X-ray examinations are used to study the pharynx and esophagus.
- Barium meal examinations are used to study the lower esophagus, stomach and duodenum.
- Barium follow-through examinations are used to study the small intestine.
- Enteroclysis, also called small bowel enema, is a barium X-ray examination used to display individual loops of the small intestine by intubating the jejunum and administering barium sulfate followed by methylcellulose or air.
- Barium enema examinations are used to study the large intestine and rectum and are classified as lower gastrointestinal series.

== Medical uses ==
Barium X-ray examinations are useful tools for the study of appearance and function of the parts of the gastrointestinal tract. They are used to diagnose and monitor esophageal reflux, dysphagia, hiatus hernia, strictures, diverticula, pyloric stenosis, gastritis, enteritis, volvulus, varices, ulcers, tumors, and gastrointestinal dysmotility, as well as to detect foreign bodies. Although barium X-ray examinations are increasingly being replaced by more modern techniques, such as computer tomography, magnetic resonance imaging, ultrasound imaging, endoscopy and capsule endoscopy, barium contrast imaging remains in common use because it offers the advantages of greater affordability, wider availability, and better resolution in assessing superficial mucosal lesions.

== Mechanism ==
Barium sulfate, a radio opaque substance that does not allow the passage of X-rays, is swallowed. As a result, areas coated by barium sulfate will appear white on an X-ray film. The passage of barium sulfate through the gastrointestinal tract is observed by a radiologist using a fluoroscope attached to a TV monitor. The radiologist takes a series of individual X-ray images at timed intervals depending on the areas to be studied. Sometimes medication which produces gas in the gastrointestinal tract is administered together with the barium sulfate. This gas distends the gastrointestinal lumen, providing better imaging conditions and in this case the procedure is called double-contrast imaging.

== Procedure ==
Clinical status and relevant medical history are reviewed prior to the studies. Patient consent is required.

=== Barium swallow ===
A barium swallow study is also known as a barium esophagram and needs little if any preparations for the study of the larynx, pharynx, and esophagus when studied alone.

Amongst the uses of barium swallow are: persistent dysphagia and odynophagia despite negative esophagogastroduodenoscopy (OGDS) findings, failed OGDS, esophageal motility disorder, globus pharyngeus, assessment of tracheoesophageal fistula, and timed barium swallow to monitor the progress of esophageal achalasia therapy. Barium sulfate suspension such as 100 ml or more of E-Z HD 200 to 250% concentration and Baritop 100% can be used. Water-soluble contrast agent such as Gastrografin (diatrizoate) and Conray (Iotalamic acid) is used instead of barium if oesophageal perforation is suspected. Low osmolar contrast medium with concentration of 300 mg/ml is used instead of gastrografin if there is risk of aspiration or there is tracheoesophageal fistula.

A thick barium mixture is swallowed in supine position and fluoroscopic images of the swallowing process are made. Then several swallows of a thin barium mixture are taken and the passage is recorded by fluoroscopy and standard radiographs. The procedure is repeated several times with the examination table tilted at various angles. A total of 350–450 mL of barium is swallowed during the process. Normally, 90% of ingested fluid should have passed into the stomach after 15 seconds.

Right anterior oblique (RAO) view is to see the oesophagus clearly, away from overlapping spine. AP (anterior-posterior) view is also done to visualise the gastroesophageal junction. AP and lateral views are also done to visualise the hypopharynx during swallowing at a frame rate of 3–4 per second. Left posterior oblique (LPO) position is used to identify hernias, mucosal rings, and varices.

=== Barium meal ===
Intravenous injection of Buscopan (Hyoscine butylbromide) 20 mg or glucagon 0.3 mg is used to distend the stomach and slow down the emptying of the contrast into the duodenum.

Right anterior oblique (RAO) view is used to demonstrate antrum and greater curve of stomach. Supine position is to demonstrate antrum and body of stomach. Left anterior oblique (LAO) view is used to see the lesser curve of stomach en face. This position is also used to check for gastroesophageal reflux when patient is asked to cough or swallow (water siphon test). Left lateral tilted with head up 45 degrees is used to demonstrate the fundus of the stomach. To demonstrate the duodenal loop, the subject can lie down in prone position on a compression pad to prevent excessive barium flowing into the duodenal loop. Anterior view of duodenal loop can be seen at RAO position. Duodenal cap can be visualised by taking images when subject lie down in prone position, RAO, supine, and then LAO positions or it can be seen on erect position with RAO and steep LAO views. Total mucosal coating of the stomach is done by asking the subject to roll to the right side into a complete circle until RAO position. Arae gastriae in the antrum (fine reticular network of grooves) is visible if good coating is achieved.

=== Small bowel follow-through ===
Indications to do this procedure are: unexplained chronic abdominal pain with weight loss, unexplained diarrhea, anemia which is caused by gastrointestinal bleeding or dependent on blood transfusion where the cause cannot be explained despite OGDS or colonoscopy investigations, partial obstruction of bowel/small bowel adhesive obstruction suspected, and unexplained malabsorption of nutrients. For barium follow-through examinations, a 6-hour period of fasting is observed prior to the study.

Barium is administered orally, sometimes mixed with diatrizoic acid (gastrografin) to reduce transit time in the bowel. Intravenous metoclopramide is sometimes also added to the mixture to enhance gastric emptying. 600 ml of 0.5% methylcellulose can be given orally, after barium meal is given, to improve the images of small bowel follow-through by reducing the time taken for barium to pass through the small intestines, and increase the transparency of the contrast-filled small bowels. Other methods to reduce transit time are to add ice cold normal saline after the administration of barium saline mixture or to give a dry meal.

X-ray images are then taken in a supine position at intervals of 20–30 minutes. Real-time fluoroscopy is used to assess bowel motility. The radiologist may press or palpate the abdomen during images to separate intestinal loops. The total time necessary for the test depends on the speed of bowel motility or transit time and may vary between 1 and 3 hours.

=== Enteroclysis ===
Enteroclysis is also known as small bowel enema. It has been largely replaced by magnetic resonance enterography/enteroclysis and computed tomography enterography/enteroclysis.

In addition to fasting for 8 hours prior to examination, a laxative may also be necessary for bowel preparation and cleansing. The main aim of this study is to distend the proximal bowel through infusion of large amount of barium suspension. Otherwise, the distension of distal small bowel is generally similar with small bowel follow-through. Therefore, there is a need to pass a tube through the nose into the jejunum (nasojejunal tube) to administer large amount of contrast. This can be unpleasant to the subject, requires more staff, longer procedural time, and higher radiation dose when compared to small bowel follow-through. The indications for enteroclysis are generally similar to small bowel follow-through. Barium suspensions such as diluted E-Z Paque 70% and Baritop 100% can be used. After that, 600 ml of 0.5% methylcellulose is administered after 500 ml of 70% barium suspension is given. Bilbao-Dotter tube and Silk tube can be used to administer barium suspension. The subject should be fasted overnight, any antispasmodic drugs should be stopped one day before the examination, and Tetracaine lozenges can be used 30 minutes before the procedure to numb the throat for nasojejunal tube insertion.

The filling of the small intestines can be viewed continuously using fluoroscopy, or viewed as standard radiographs taken at frequent intervals. The technique is a double-contrast procedure that allows detailed imaging of the entire small intestine. However, the procedure may take 6 hours or longer to complete and is quite uncomfortable to undergo.

== Interpretation of results ==
Zenker's diverticulum as seen in a barium swallow examination

- Enteroclysis has shown to be very accurate in diagnosing small bowel diseases, with a sensitivity of 93.1% and specificity of 96.9%. It permits detection of lesion which may not be seen with other imaging techniques. There is no significant difference in terms of detection of clinically significant findings, sensitivity or specificity between enteroclysis and CT enterography. Enteroclysis compares favorably with wireless capsule endoscopy and double-balloon endoscopy in the diagnosis of mucosal abnormalities of the small bowel.
- The interpretation of standard barium swallow examinations for assessing dysphagia is operator and interpreter dependent. It has poor sensitivity for subtle abnormalities but is more sensitive in detecting esophageal webs and rings than gastroscopy. The best initial evaluation of suspected oropharyngeal dysphagia is a barium study. Barium swallow studies remain the main investigation of dysphagia. Barium studies may detect pharyngeal tumors that are difficult to visualize endoscopically.
- Barium follow-through examinations are the most commonly used imaging technique in assessing patients with Crohn's disease, although CT and magnetic resonance imaging are widely accepted as being superior. However Barium examinations remain superior in the depiction of mucosal abnormalities. The features of Crohn's disease are well described by barium follow-through examinations, appearing as a typical "cobblestone pattern", but no information is obtained regarding extraluminal disease. Radiographic imaging in Crohn's disease provides clinicians with objective evaluations of small bowel regions that are not accessible to standard endoscopic techniques. Because of its length and complex loops, the small intestine is the most difficult part of the gastrointestinal tract to evaluate. Most endoscopic techniques are limited to the examination of proximal or distal segments, hence Barium follow-through remains in most centres the test of choice for the investigation of abdominal pain, diarrhoea and in particular diseases manifesting mucosal abnormalities such as coeliac and Crohn's disease.
- Barium swallow studies are better than endoscopy at demonstrating the anatomic findings in gastroesophageal reflux disease after anti-reflux surgery.
- Barium fluoroscopic examinations have some advantages over computed tomography and magnetic resonance techniques, such as higher spatial resolution and the ability to examine bowel peristalsis and distension in real time.
- Many infections and parasitic infestations produce patterns of the luminal surface, which are best seen on Barium examinations. Certain parasites are seen as filling defects outlined by Barium and Barium examinations play an important role in the diagnosis of intestinal infections and infestations as compared to other techniques. Barium studies show tapeworms and roundworms as thin, linear filling defects of the bowel. Because roundworms have a developed alimentary tract, barium may outline the parasites' intestinal tracts on delayed images. In Strongyloidiasis barium studies show intestinal wall oedema, thickening of intestinal folds with flattening, and atrophy of the overlying mucosa. Schistosomiasis caused by infection with flatworms have an appearance resembling colitis ulcerosa, with inflammatory polyps, ulcers, fibrosis, wall thickening, loss of haustration, and stenosis in Barium X-rays. Anisakiasis is demonstrated by Barium X-rays as bowel wall oedema, thickening, ulceration, or stricture due to inflammation. Sometimes worms are seen as long, thread-like, linear filling defects up to 30 cm long. In Typhlitis Barium studies show oedema, ulceration, and inflammation of bowel wall resulting in wall thickening. In pseudomembranous colitis, barium studies show pancolitis with thumb printing and shaggy margins as well as plaque-like eccentric, nodular or polypoid appearance.
- Barium studies and computer tomography are the most common tools used to diagnose gastrointestinal lymphoma. Barium contrast is more sensitive in the demonstration of subtle mucosa and sub-mucosa abnormalities but computer tomography is the method of choice for determining the extent of disease and staging as well as related complications such as fistulation and perforation. Submucosal nodules or masses form a bull's-eye or target appearance on barium studies.

== Adverse effects ==
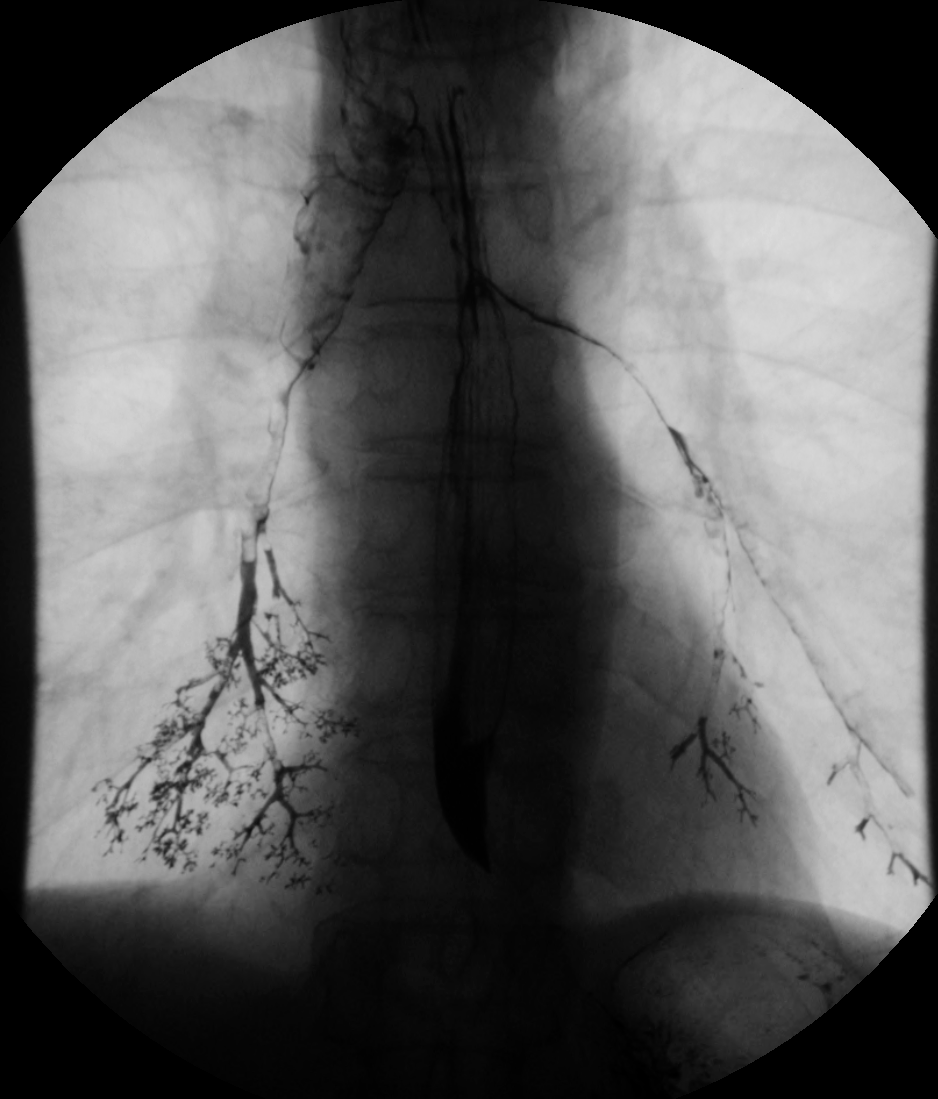
Barium in the lungs resulting from aspiration during a barium swallow

- Radiographic examinations involve radiation exposure in the form of X-rays.
- Although barium ions are toxic, their use is generally regarded as safe because the small amounts of barium ions available in solution and absorbed by the gastrointestinal tract are deemed to be negligible; however, isolated cases of barium encephalopathy have been described following absorption of barium from the intestinal tract.
- Constipation and abdominal pain may occur after barium meals.
- The formation of baroliths, which may need to be removed surgically, is a complication of the use of barium sulfate.
- Barium sulfate may cause serious peritoneal irritation.
- Leakage of barium sulfate into the abdominal cavity may occur in people with duodenal ulcers or other perforations and may lead to peritonitis, adhesion, and granulomas; it is associated with a high mortality rate. Leakage of barium into the mediastinum or peritoneal cavity may lead to endotoxic shock, which is often fatal; as a result, the use of barium as a contrast agent is contraindicated when there is a suspicion or possibility of compromise of bowel wall integrity.
- Aspiration or inhalation of barium sulfate into the lungs during oral application can lead to serious respiratory complications leading to fatal aspiration pneumonia or asphyxiation.
- Hypersensitivity and allergic reactions are rare but some additives contained in barium preparations may induce immune reactions.

Complete gastrointestinal obstruction is a contraindication for barium studies.

== History ==
Barium sulfate as a contrast medium was evolved from the prior use of bismuth preparations which were too toxic. The use of bismuth preparations had been described as early as 1898. Barium sulfate as a contrast medium in medical practice was introduced largely as a result of the works of Krause a director of the Bonn Polyclinic, now the medical faculty of the University of Bonn and his colleagues Bachem and Gunther. In a paper read in 1910 at the radiological congress they advocated for the use of barium sulfate as an opaque contrast medium in medicine.
