= Magnetic resonance enterography =

Medical imaging technique

MR Enterography
- Purpose: evaluate bowel wall features of both upper and lower gastro-intestinal tract

Magnetic resonance enterography is a magnetic resonance imaging technique used to evaluate bowel wall features of both upper and lower gastro-intestinal tract, although it is usually used for small bowel evaluation. It is a less invasive technique with the advantages of no ionizing radiation exposure, multiplanarity and high contrast resolution for soft tissue.

The term MR enterography and MR enteroclysis are similar, but the first is referred to a MR exam with orally administered enteric contrast media, and the second to a more invasive technique in which enteric contrast media is administered through the fluoroscopy-guided positioned nasojejunal tube.

The need for imaging assessment of small bowel diseases comes from the limits of traditional endoscopy in evaluating ileum loops, as other modern techniques such as capsule endoscopy are not routinely performed as it is seldom available in most centers. Over the past several years assessment of small bowel diseases was performed by Barium follow through, or upper and lower gastrointestinal series, that provided plan film of bowel loop lumen, thanks to the swallowing or instillation of radiopaque agents mixed with water or other neutral contrast media. Gastrointestinal series allow to depict lumen caliber, gross mucosal alterations and wide fistulous tract, but were poorly diagnostic for submucosal or extraluminal features. CT scan instead provides cross sectional and multiplanar images of intraluminal and extra-mucosal, extra-luminal or even extra-enteric features, but costing higher radiation dose.

The spread of MR technique has revolutionized the diagnostic imaging of the small bowel loop, restricting CT scan to particular situations, such as emergency or MR contraindications like patients with pacemaker implant, recently implanted vascular/bilious stent or other ferromagnetic prosthesis/devices. It is a safe, multi-planar imaging modality with high soft tissue contrast resolution that does not expose to ionizing radiation, so it is feasible for young patients or when several follow up are required.

== Preparation ==
Cathartic preparation should be performed in order to clean residual stool from bowel loops from to allow a better visualization of mucosal features and an easier luminal distention as well. This type of preparation usually implies a fiber restricted diet and intake of water solution with laxative effect few days before the exam, and abstaining from food intake starting from six hours prior to the study.

Use of enteric contrast media is recommended, aiming to distend small bowel loops, and it is administered orally at regular intervals approximately 40 minutes before the study.

The type of endo-luminal contrast media varies among negative contrast media, consisting of superparamagnetic agents that evoke low signal both in T1 and T2 weighted images, positive contrast media, represented by paramagnetic agents, that produce high signal on both sequences, or biphasic contrast media, that gives high signal intensity in T2 and low intensity in T1. This latter, that consists of water, methyl cellulose or polyethylene glycol, is the most used, because of the wide availability, low cost, good patient compliance, and good taste. Water enema may be administered as well in order to distend bowel loop (MR-colonography).

Intravenous contrast media increases diagnostic capability of enterography MRI. Although it is better tolerated than iodinated contrast media used for CT-scan, the use of gadolinium-based contrast agent should always be preceded by kidney function assessment, in order to reduce the risk of nephrogenic systemic fibrosis, and prophylactic protocol in case of previous allergic reactions.

Antispasmodic agents may be used to reduce the motion artifacts due to peristalsis.

== Protocol ==
High field MR scanners and the use of multi-channel phased array surface coil are suggested in order to obtain adequately diagnostic images.

The subject drinks 1.5 litres of oral contrast (3% mannitol) over 30 to 45 minutes before the scan. After that venous access is obtained and Buscopan (hyoscine butylbromide) is given to reduce the gastrointestinal tract movement, thus reducing motion artifact on MRI scan.

The patient is placed in prone position, thus provides better separation of bowel loops and reduces breathing movement-artifacts. Although MR enterography protocols may vary among different hospitals/institutions, the main sequences are the following:

1. Axial and coronal balanced steady-state free precession imaging (SSFP, commercial name FISP)
2. Axial and coronal single-shot-fast spin echo (commercial name HASTE) with fat saturation
3. Axial and coronal 3D spoiled gradient echo (commercial name VIBE) before and after gadolinium contrast administration
4. Axial Diffusion Weighted Imaging (DWI) sequences, using at least 2 B-value
5. Cine loop technique using SSFP sequences

== Indications ==
The most common indication of MR enterography is diagnosis and follow up of inflammatory and neoplastic small bowel disease.

== Risks and contraindications ==
Risks and contraindications are the same of any MR exam.
