= Normalized chromosome value =

Normalized chromosome value (NCV) is a mathematical calculation for comparing each chromosome under tested in cell free DNA (cfDNA) for detecting genetic disorder of the fetus. NCV calculation removes variation within and between sequencing runs to optimize test precision.
