= Selective abortion =

Selective abortion may refer to:

- Sex-selective abortion
- When a genetic test is performed that detects an undesirable trait; see Disability-selective abortion
- Selective reduction
