= Prenatal testing =

Testing for diseases or conditions in a fetus

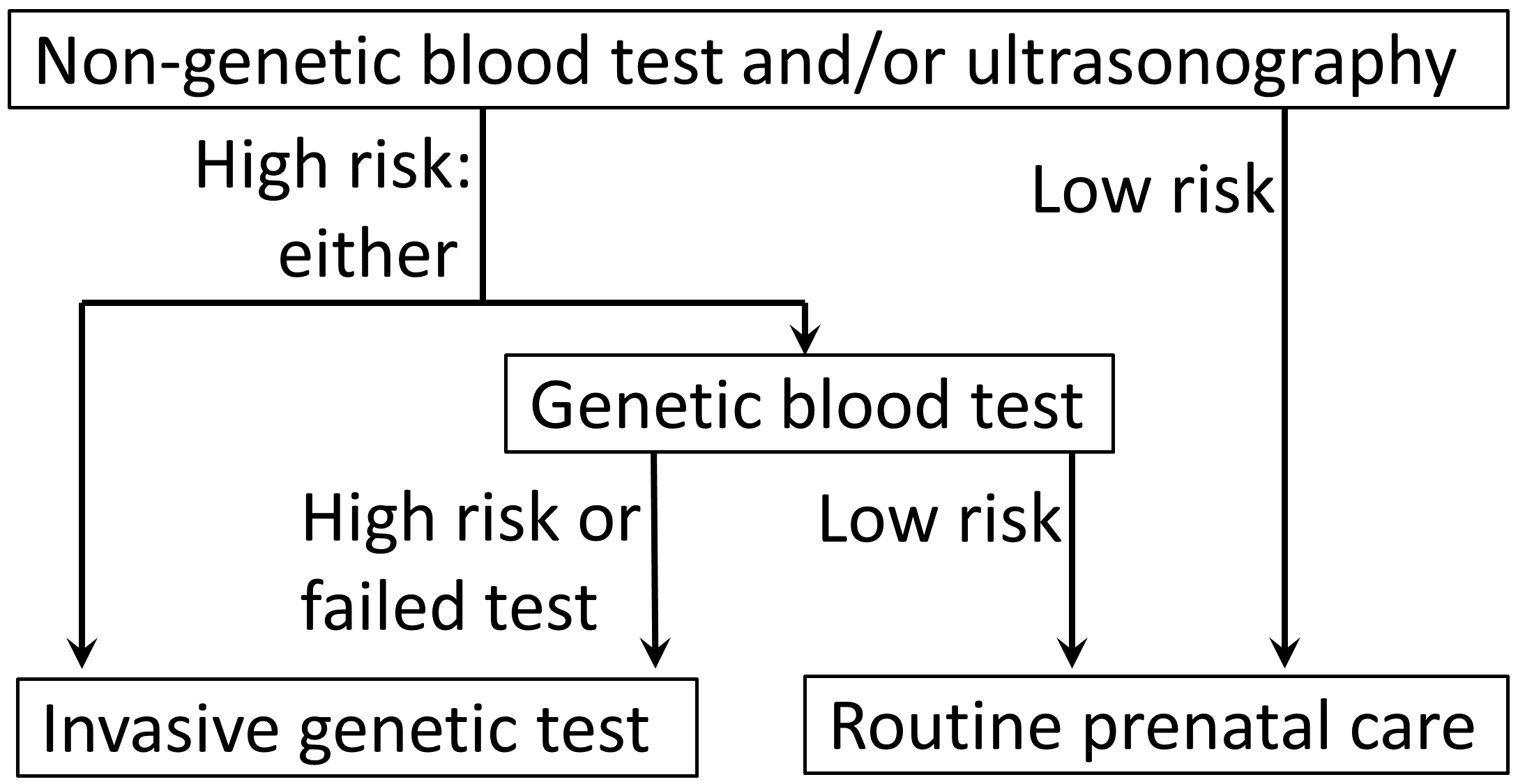
- An example of an algorithm for prenatal testing for chromosomal abnormalities.
- Synonyms: Prenatal screening, prenatal diagnosis, genetic testing
- Purpose: To monitor maternal and fetal health and progression, as well as, detect fetal abnormalities during pregnancy.

Prenatal testing is a tool that can be used to detect some birth defects at various stages prior to birth. Prenatal testing consists of prenatal screening and prenatal diagnosis, which are aspects of prenatal care that focus on detecting problems with the pregnancy as early as possible. These may be anatomic and physiologic problems with the health of the zygote, embryo, or fetus, either before gestation even starts (as in preimplantation genetic diagnosis) or as early in gestation as practicable. Screening can detect problems such as neural tube defects, chromosome abnormalities, and gene mutations that would lead to genetic disorders and birth defects such as spina bifida, cleft palate, Down syndrome, trisomy 18, Tay–Sachs disease, sickle cell anemia, thalassemia, cystic fibrosis, muscular dystrophy, and fragile X syndrome. Some tests are designed to discover problems which primarily affect the health of the mother, such as PAPP-A to detect pre-eclampsia or glucose tolerance tests to diagnose gestational diabetes. Screening can also detect anatomical defects such as hydrocephalus, anencephaly, heart defects, and amniotic band syndrome.

Prenatal screening focuses on finding problems among a large population with affordable and noninvasive methods. Prenatal diagnosis focuses on pursuing additional detailed information once a particular problem has been found, and can sometimes be more invasive. The most common screening procedures are routine ultrasounds, blood tests, and blood pressure measurement. Common diagnosis procedures include amniocentesis and chorionic villus sampling. In some cases, the tests are administered to determine if the fetus will be aborted, though physicians and patients also find it useful to diagnose high-risk pregnancies early so that delivery can be scheduled in a tertiary care hospital where the baby can receive appropriate care.

Prenatal testing in recent years has been moving towards non-invasive methods to determine the fetal risk for genetic disorders. The rapid advancement of modern high-performance molecular technologies along with the discovery of cell-free fetal DNA (cffDNA) in maternal plasma has led to new methods for the determination of fetal chromosomal aneuploidies. This type of testing is referred to as non-invasive prenatal testing (NIPT) or as non-invasive prenatal screening. Invasive procedures remain important, though, especially for their diagnostic value in confirming positive non-invasive findings and detecting genetic disorders. Birth defects have an occurrence between 1 and 6%.

== Purpose ==
There are three purposes of prenatal diagnosis: (1) to enable timely medical or surgical treatment of a condition before or after birth, (2) to give the parents the chance to abort a fetus with the diagnosed condition, and (3) to give parents the chance to prepare psychologically, socially, financially, and medically for a baby with a health problem or disability, or for the likelihood of a stillbirth. Prior information about problems in pregnancy means that healthcare staff as well as parents can better prepare themselves for the delivery of a child with a health problem. For example, Down syndrome is associated with cardiac defects that may need intervention immediately upon birth.

	Name of test (category)'	When	Invasivity	How	Turnaround time	Tests/Screens for	Associated risks
Routine prenatal tests	Maternal weight	Every checkup appointment	Non-invasive	Scale	Immediately	Baselines, pre-pregnancy weight estimates, tracking weight gain/loss, pattern observation	NA
Routine prenatal tests	Maternal blood pressure/Preeclampsia screen	Every checkup appointment	Non-Invasive	Blood pressure cuff	Immediately	Pre-eclampsia/hypertension	NA
Routine prenatal tests	Maternal urinalysis/urine test screen	Periodically	Non-invasive	Urine collection	~a few minutes – ~1 week	hCG, diabetes, dehydration, preeclampsia, kidney and bladder infection/disease	NA
Routine prenatal tests	Ultrasound	Periodically	Non-invasive/Invasive	Abdominal or Transvaginal	~1 day – ~1 week	Fetal development, neural tube defects, birth defects, and various other physical abnormalities (see below for specific ultrasound tests)	NA
Routine prenatal tests	Fetal heart-rate monitoring	Week 12 – onward	Non-invasive	Handheld abdominal doppler or fetoscope	Immediately	Heart rate irregularities	NA
Genetic prenatal tests	Carrier screening (Screen)	Anytime (before or during pregnancy)	Less invasive	Cheek swab or blood draw	~2–4 weeks	Determining if a parent carries specific genes associated with certain (primarily autosomal recessive) conditions	Very low risk, however there is the potential for bruising, pain, nerve damage, fainting, haematoma, bacterial infection, and bloodborne pathogen exposure.
Genetic prenatal tests	Chorionic villus sampling/Biopsy, CVS (diagnostic)	Week 8 – 14	Invasive	Transabdominal or transcervical insertion of a needle, forceps or syringe to obtain a fetal placenta tissue sample	~1–2 weeks	Chromosomal abnormalities, birth defects	Miscarriage, preterm labor/delivery, infection, cramping, bleeding, premature rupture of amniotic membrane, baby limb defects
Genetic prenatal tests	Cell-free fetal DNA (cfDNA) Test/Noninvasive prenatal test (NIPT) (screen)	Week 10 – onward	Less invasive	Blood draw	~1–2 weeks	Gender, chromosomal abnormalities	Very low risk, however there is the potential for bruising, pain, nerve damage, fainting, haematoma, bacterial infection, and bloodborne pathogen exposure.
Genetic prenatal tests	First trimester screening	Week 10 – 13	Invasive	Nuchal translucency ultrasound & blood prick/draw	~1 week	Chromosomal abnormalities, birth defects, heart defects	Very low risk, however there is the potential for bruising, pain, nerve damage, fainting, haematoma, bacterial infection, and bloodborne pathogen exposure.
Genetic prenatal tests	Alpha-fetoprotein (AFP)/modified sequential/multiple marker/quad/triple/maternal serum test (screen)	Weeks 14 – 22	Less invasive	Blood draw	~1–2 weeks	Maternal hormone levels, risk of gestational hypertension and preeclampsia, chromosome abnormalities, neural tube defects	Very low risk, however there is the potential for bruising, pain, nerve damage, fainting, haematoma, bacterial infection, and bloodborne pathogen exposure.
Genetic prenatal tests	Second trimester screening (screen)	Week 15 – 22	Invasive	Ultrasound and multiple markers or quad screen blood draw	~1–2 weeks	Chromosomal abnormalities, neural tube defects, abdominal wall defects, heart defects, other major physical defects	Very low risk, however there is the potential for bruising, pain, nerve damage, fainting, haematoma, bacterial infection, and bloodborne pathogen exposure.
Genetic prenatal tests	Amniocentesis (diagnostic)	Week 15 – 20	Invasive	Transabdominal needle insertion to obtain an amniotic fluid sample	~2 weeks	Chromosomal abnormalities, autosomal genetic conditions, neural tube defects, abdominal wall defects, birth defects	Miscarriage (1%), preterm labor/delivery, infection, cramping, bleeding, premature rupture of amniotic membrane
Genetic prenatal tests	Cordocentesis/Percutaneous umbilical cord blood sampling (PUBS) (diagnostic)	Week 17 – onward	Invasive	Fetal blood sample from umbilical cord	~3 days	Chromosomal abnormalities, blood disorders (fetal hemolytic disease)	Miscarriage (1–2%), preterm labor/delivery, infection, bleeding, decreased fetal heart rate, premature rupture of amniotic membrane, death
Genetic prenatal tests	Preimplantation genetic diagnosis (PGD) (screen)	During IVF, prior to implantation	Non-invasive	IVF embryo examination	~1–2 weeks	Chromosomal abnormalities, autosomal recessive conditions	NA
Additional prenatal tests	Glucose challenge test (screen)	Week 26 – 28	Less invasive	Maternal blood draw after ingestion of glucose drink	~1–2 days	To indicate the possibility of gestational diabetes	Very low risk, however there is the potential for bruising, pain, nerve damage, fainting, haematoma, bacterial infection, and bloodborne pathogen exposure.
Additional prenatal tests	Oral glucose tolerance test (OGTT) (screen)	Week 26 – 28	Less invasive	Maternal blood draws before and after ingestion of glucose drink, requires fasting	~2–3 days	To properly diagnose gestational diabetes following an abnormal result from the glucose challenge screen	Very low risk, however there is the potential for bruising, pain, nerve damage, fainting, haematoma, bacterial infection, and bloodborne pathogen exposure.
Additional prenatal tests	Non-stress test	Week 28 – onward	Non-invasive	Abdominal contraction/Fetal heart rate belt	Immediately	Fetal heart rate vs movement, oxygen levels (indicating problems stemming from the placenta or umbilical cord), fetal distress	NA
Additional prenatal tests	Group B Strep Test	Week 36 – 38	Invasive	Vaginal swab	~1–2 days	Bacteria indicating Group B Strep	NA
Additional prenatal tests	Cervix dilation check	Week 37 – onward	Invasive	The doctor takes a manual measurement inside the cervix	Immediately	Signs or progress of dilation, prodromal labor	Infection, premature rupture of amniotic membrane
Additional prenatal tests	External fetal monitoring	During Labor, after rupture of amnioatic sac	Invasive	Spiral wire electrode attached to body part (typically the scalp) of fetus via cervical insertion	Immediately	Heart rate irregularities, monitoring fetal heart rate	Fetal bruising/infection at attachment site
Additional prenatal tests	Kleihauer-Betke/Fetal cells in maternal blood (FCMB) test (screen)	Situational	Less invasive	Blood draw	<1 day	Fetal red blood cells in the mother's blood, fetomaternal hemorrhage	Very low risk, however there is the potential for bruising, pain, nerve damage, fainting, haematoma, bacterial infection, and bloodborne pathogen exposure.

=== Prenatal screening ===
==== Maternal serum screening ====
First-trimester maternal serum screening can check levels of free β-hCG, PAPP-A, intact or beta hCG, or h-hCG in the woman's serum, and combine these with the measurement of nuchal translucency (NT). Some institutions also look for the presence of a fetal nasal bone on the ultrasound.

Second-trimester maternal serum screening (AFP screening, triple screen, quad screen, or penta screen) can check levels of alpha fetoprotein, β-hCG, inhibin-A, estriol, and h-hCG (hyperglycosolated hCG) in the woman's serum.

The triple test measures serum levels of AFP, estriol, and beta-hCG, with a 70% sensitivity and 5% false-positive rate. It is complemented in some regions of the United States, as the Quad test (adding inhibin A to the panel, resulting in an 81% sensitivity and 5% false-positive rate for detecting Down syndrome when taken at 15–18 weeks of gestational age).

The biomarkers PAPP-A and β-hCG seem to be altered for pregnancies resulting from ICSI, causing a higher false-positive rate. Correction factors have been developed and should be used when screening for Down syndrome in singleton pregnancies after ICSI, but in twin pregnancies such correction factors have not been fully elucidated. In vanishing twin pregnancies with a second gestational sac with a dead fetus, first-trimester screening should be based solely on the maternal age and the nuchal translucency scan as biomarkers are altered in these cases.

==== Advances in prenatal screening ====
Measurement of fetal proteins in maternal serum is a part of standard prenatal screening for fetal aneuploidy and neural tube defects. Computational predictive model shows that extensive and diverse feto-maternal protein trafficking occurs during pregnancy and can be readily detected non-invasively in maternal whole blood. This computational approach circumvented a major limitation, the abundance of maternal proteins interfering with the detection of fetal proteins, to fetal proteomic analysis of maternal blood. Entering fetal gene transcripts previously identified in maternal whole blood into a computational predictive model helped develop a comprehensive proteomic network of the term neonate. It also shows that the fetal proteins detected in pregnant woman's blood originate from a diverse group of tissues and organs from the developing fetus. Development proteomic networks dominate the functional characterization of the predicted proteins, illustrating the potential clinical application of this technology as a way to monitor normal and abnormal fetal development.

The difference in methylation of specific DNA sequences between mother and fetus can be used to identify fetal-specific DNA in the blood circulation of the mother. In a study published in the March 6, 2011, online issue of Nature, using this non-invasive technique a group of investigators from Greece and UK achieved correct diagnosis of 14 trisomy 21 (Down syndrome) and 26 normal cases. Using massive parallel sequencing, a study testing for trisomy 21 only, successfully detected 209 of 212 cases (98.6%) with 3 false-positives in 1,471 pregnancies (0.2%). With commercially available non-invasive (blood) testing for Down syndrome having become available to patients in the United States and already available in China, in October 2011, the International Society for Prenatal Diagnosis created some guidance. Based on its sensitivity and specificity, it constitutes an advanced screening test and that positive results require confirmation by an invasive test, and that while effective in the diagnosis of Down syndrome, it cannot assess half the abnormalities detected by invasive testing. The test is not recommended for general use until results from broader studies have been reported, but may be useful in high-risk patients in conjunction with genetic counseling.

A study in 2012 found that the maternal plasma cell-free DNA test was also able to detect trisomy 18 (Edwards syndrome) in 100% of the cases (59/59) at a false-positive rate of 0.28%, and trisomy 13 (Patau syndrome) in 91.7% of the cases (11/12) at a false-positive rate of 0.97%. The test interpreted 99.1% of samples (1,971/1,988); among the 17 samples without an interpretation, three were trisomy 18. The study stated that if z-score cutoffs for trisomy 18 and 13 were raised slightly, the overall false-positive rates for the three aneuploidies could be as low as 0.1% (2/1,688) at an overall detection rate of 98.9% (280/283) for common aneuploidies (this includes all three trisomies: Down, Edwards and Patau).

=== Prenatal genetic testing ===
The goal of prenatal genetic testing is to identify pregnancies at high risk of abnormalities, allowing for early intervention, termination or appropriate management and preparation measures. Prenatal genetic testing can be subdivided into two categories: screening and diagnostic testing. Screening informs an individual of the potential for certain abnormalities occurring, whereas, diagnostic testing is used to confirm/diagnose that specific abnormalities exist within the fetus. Prenatal screens are typically less invasive than prenatal diagnostic tests. Screening comes with much lower risks, however, the results are not as definitive as diagnostic tests. Providers often recommend following up with a diagnostic test upon receipt of a positive result from a specific screen.

Medically invasive techniques are those in which a tool is used to access something inside the body. There are varying degrees of invasiveness, depending on what specimen is required to complete the test. The typical blood draw administered by a healthcare professional is one of the most common invasive medical practices. Since it causes minimal discomfort and there is very low risk associated with the sample collection, a blood draw is considered less invasive. Chorionic villus sampling (CVS) and Amniocentesis are the most invasive prenatal tests because there is greater associated risk and the sample is more difficult to access. These procedures are done via needle insertion into the abdomen to collect a sample within the uterus, meaning exceptional care/precision is required. Prenatal genetic testing can identify various chromosomal abnormalities, autosomal conditions, various birth defects, and some fetal blood disorders.

Chromosomal abnormalities are when the chromosomes differ in either structure or number when compared to a typical reference genome. This includes chromosomal deletions, duplications, inversions, and translocations. Some examples of chromosomal abnormalities include:

- Down syndrome (trisomy 21)
- Edwards syndrome (trisomy 18)
- Patau syndrome (trisomy 13)
- Turner syndrome (monosomy X)
- Klinefelter syndrome (XXY)
- Trisomy X (XXX)
- Jacobs syndrome (XYY)
- Pallister–Killian syndrome
- Wolf–Hirschhorn syndrome
- Cri-du-chat syndrome
- WAGR syndrome
- DiGeorge syndrome
- Fragile X syndrome
- Prader-Willi syndrome
- Angelman syndrome

Autosomal recessive conditions occur when both parents pass on a mutation within an autosomal (non-sex) chromosome. Some examples of autosomal recessive conditions are:

- Cystic fibrosis
- Sickle cell anemia
- Tay–Sachs disease
- Spinal muscular atrophy
- Autosomal recessive polycystic kidney disease
- Phenylketonuria

Neural tube defects are a type of birth defect that occurs when the neural tube of a fetus does not form/close properly, potentially effecting other systems throughout the body. Some examples of neural tube defects are:

- Spina bifida
- Anencephaly
- Encephalocele
- Tethered spinal cord syndrome

Abdominal wall defects are a type of birth defect that occur when the abdominal wall of a fetus does not form properly, potentially effecting other organs throughout the body. Some examples of abdominal wall defects are:

- Gastroschisis
- Omphalocele
- Bladder exstrophy
- Cloacal exstrophy
- Ectopia cordis
- Pentalogy of Cantrell
- Body-stalk anomaly

Blood disorders can occur from a negative interaction between the maternal blood and the fetal blood. An example of a fetal blood disorder is Hemolytic disease of the fetus.

=== Ultrasound imaging and serum markers as indications for genetic testing ===
Ultrasound imaging provides the opportunity to conduct a nuchal translucency (NT) scan screening for chromosomal abnormalities such as Down syndrome (trisomy 21), Edwards syndrome (trisomy 18), and Patau syndrome (trisomy 13). Using the information from the NT scan the mother can be offered an invasive diagnostic test for fetal chromosomal abnormalities. Serum markers are used in a similar fashion to identify gestations that should be recommended for further testing. When the NT scan or serum markers arouse suspicion for chromosomal abnormalities the following genetic tests may be conducted on fetal or placental tissue samples: Interphase-fluorescence in situ hybridization (FISH), quantitative PCR and direct preparation of chromosomes from chorionic villi.

=== Screens ===
==== Carrier screening ====
Carrier screening is a general DNA test that uses a blood or cheek swab sample to determine if the parents carry certain genetic conditions. This test can be done anytime, whether the individual(s) are considering starting a family or have already become pregnant. Various types of carrier screens are available that test for progressively more genetic abnormalities. The single gene/condition screen will test for a specific condition, whereas, the expanded carrier screen will test for hundreds of different abnormalities that can be inherited by a fetus. There are also three gene/condition and ethnic specific carrier tests. In the case of a positive test result, further testing is often recommended, as the carrier test only determines if the parent(s) is a carrier, not if the gene has definitively been passed to the fetus.

==== Placental acellular DNA (pa-DNA) ====
Placental acellular (fetal cell-free) DNA testing (pa-DNA) allows for the detection of apoptotic placental cells and placental DNA circulating in maternal blood for the noninvasive diagnosis of fetal aneuploidy. A meta-analysis that investigated the success rate of using placental acellular DNA from maternal blood to screen for aneuploidies found that this technique detected trisomy 13 in 99% of the cases, trisomy 18 in 98% of the cases and trisomy 21 in 99% of the cases. Failed tests using placental acellular DNA are more likely to occur in fetuses with trisomy 13 and trisomy 18 but not with trisomy 21. Previous studies found elevated levels of acellular placental DNA for trisomy 13 and 21 from maternal serum when compared to women with euploid pregnancies. However, an elevation of acellular DNA for trisomy 18 was not observed. Circulating placental nucleated cells comprise only three to six percent of maternal blood plasma DNA, reducing the detection rate of fetal developmental abnormalities. Two alternative approaches have been developed for the detection of fetal aneuploidy. The first involves the measuring of the allelic ratio of single nucleotide polymorphisms (SNPs) in the mRNA coding region in the placenta. The next approach is analyzing both maternal and placental DNA and looking for differences in the DNA methylation patterns.

==== First/Second/Third trimester Screen ====
The first, second, combined, and third trimester screens typically consist of an ultrasound (abdominal and/or transvaginal) and maternal blood/serum testing. The ultrasound is used to visually assess the growth, development, and activity of the fetus through imaging observations and measurements. The ultrasound portion of the first trimester screen can include a nuchal translucency screen and a fetal nasal bone determination screen. The available blood tests from the first trimester screen can test for plasma protein A and human chorionic gonadotropin. The second trimester screen looks at specific blood markers, to include the estriol, inhibin and human chorionic gonadotropin hormones and often consists of Alpha-fetoprotein (AFP) screening. Any abnormal results from these screening tests can indicate the possibility of abnormal conditions such as Trisomy 18, Trisomy 21 (Down syndrome), and spina bifida.

==== Alpha-fetoprotein (AFP)/multiple marker test ====
The AFP test is often done in the second trimester using the serum from the maternal blood draw. This test looks at a specific protein that is formed in the liver of the fetus and released into the fluid contents of the womb, which is then absorbed into the mother's blood stream. Multiple determinations stem from the results of AFP testing. Genetically, it can expose chromosomal and neural defects.

=== Diagnostic tests ===
==== Chorionic Villus Sampling (CVS) ====
CVS is an invasive diagnostic test that can be done during the first trimester of pregnancy for individuals that are looking to identify or are at higher risk of passing chromosomal abnormalities. A tissue cell sample of the placenta is obtained abdominally via needle or via vaginal insertion of a catheter/syringe into the cervix in combination with ultrasound to guide the procedure. Positive results from CVS require blood testing for confirmation.

==== Amniocentesis ====
Amniocentesis is an invasive diagnostic test that can be done during the second trimester of pregnancy for individuals that are looking to identify or are at higher risk of passing chromosomal and/or neural tube abnormalities. The procedure is typically done via needle, in combination with ultrasound for guidance, to obtain a sample of the amniotic fluid surrounding the fetus.

==== Cordocentesis/Percutaneous umbilical blood sampling (PUBS) ====
PUBS is an invasive diagnostic test that can be done during the second trimester of pregnancy for individuals that are looking to identify or are at higher risk of passing chromosomal and/or blood abnormalities. The demand for cordocentesis tests is diminishing because it has been replaced with CVS and Amniocentesis, which carry less risk. The procedure is typically done via needle into the mother's abdomen, in combination with ultrasound for guidance, to obtain a blood sample from the umbilical cord of the fetus.

== Prenatal genetic testing analysis techniques ==
=== Digital PCR ===
Recently, it has been proposed that digital PCR analysis can be conducted on fetal cell-free DNA for detection of fetal aneuploidy. Research has shown that digital PCR can be used to differentiate between normal and aneuploid DNA.

A variation of the PCR technique called multiplex ligation-dependent probe amplification (MLPA), targeting DNA, has been successively applied for diagnosing fetal aneuploidy as a chromosome- or gene-specific assay.

=== Shotgun sequencing ===
Fetal cell-free DNA has been directly sequenced using shotgun sequencing technology. In one study, DNA was obtained from the blood plasma of eighteen pregnant women. This was followed by mapping the chromosome using the quantification of fragments. This was done using advanced methods in DNA sequencing resulting in the parallel sequencing of the fetal DNA. The amount of sequence tags mapped to each chromosome was counted. If there was a surplus or deficiency in any of the chromosomes, this meant that there was a fetal aneuploid. Using this method of shotgun sequencing, the successful identification of trisomy 21 (Down syndrome), trisomy 18 (Edward syndrome), and trisomy 13 (Patau syndrome) was possible. This method of noninvasive diagnosis is now starting to be heavily used and researched further.

=== Other techniques ===
Microarray analysis, karyotyping, and different genome sequencing techniques are also used to detect abnormalities. Fetal components in samples from maternal blood plasma can be analyzed by genome-wide techniques not only by total DNA, but also by methylated DNA immunoprecipitation (with tiling array), microRNA (such as with Megaplex) and total RNA (RNA-sequencing).

== By invasiveness ==
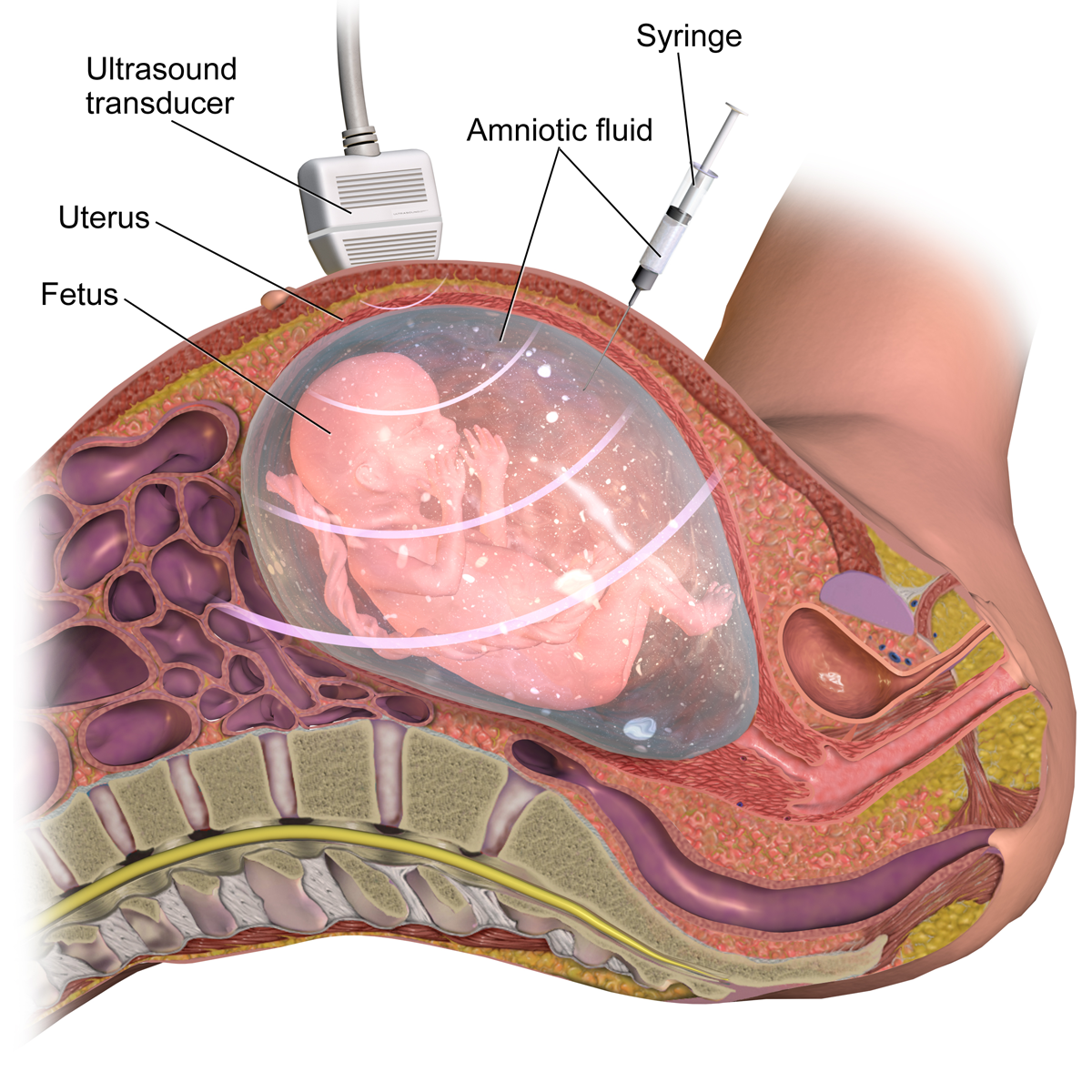
Amniocentesis is an example of an invasive diagnostic prenatal test.

Diagnostic prenatal testing can be performed by invasive or non-invasive methods. An invasive method involves probes or needles being inserted into the uterus, e.g. amniocentesis, which can be done from about 14 weeks gestation, and usually up to about 20 weeks, and chorionic villus sampling, which can be done earlier (between 9.5 and 12.5 weeks gestation) but which may be slightly more risky to the fetus. One study comparing transabdominal chorionic villus sampling with second trimester amniocentesis found no significant difference in the total pregnancy loss between the two procedures. However, transcervical chorionic villus sampling carries a significantly higher risk, compared with a second-trimester amniocentesis, of total pregnancy loss (relative risk 1.40; 95% confidence interval 1.09 to 1.81) and spontaneous miscarriage (9.4% risk; relative risk 1.50; 95% confidence interval 1.07 to 2.11).

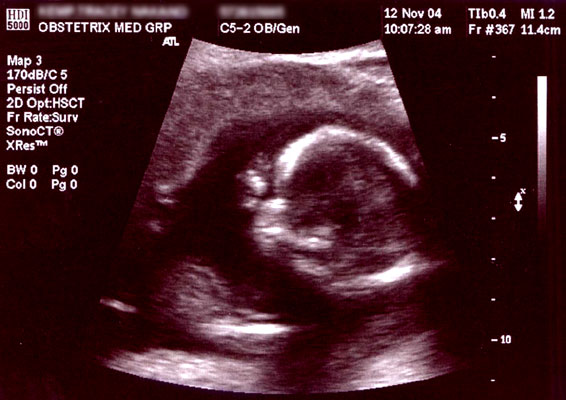
Ultrasonography is an example of a non-invasive diagnostic prenatal test.

Non-invasive techniques include examinations of the woman's womb through ultrasonography and maternal serum screens (i.e. Alpha-fetoprotein). Blood tests for select trisomies (Down syndrome in the United States, Down and Edwards syndromes in China) based on detecting cell-free placental DNA present in maternal blood, also known as non-invasive prenatal testing (NIPT), have become available. If an elevated risk of chromosomal or genetic abnormality is indicated by a non-invasive screening test, a more invasive technique may be employed to gather more information. In the case of neural tube defects, a detailed ultrasound can non-invasively provide a definitive diagnosis.

One of the major advantages of the non-invasive prenatal testing is that the chance of a false positive result is very low. This accuracy is very important for the pregnant woman, as due to a high sensitivity and specificity of the testing, especially for Down syndrome, the invasive testing could be avoided, which includes the risk of a miscarriage.

=== Testing guidelines and qualifying risk factors for invasive testing ===
The American College of Obstetricians and Gynecologists (ACOG) guidelines currently recommend that anyone who is pregnant, regardless of age, should discuss and be offered non-invasive prenatal genetic screening and diagnostic testing options. Non-invasive prenatal genetic screening is typically performed at the end of the 1st trimester (11–14 weeks) or during the beginning of the second trimester (15–20 weeks). This involves the pregnant woman receiving a blood draw with a needle and a syringe and an ultrasound of the fetus. Screening tests can then include serum analyte screening or cell-free fetal DNA, and nuchal translucency ultrasound [NT], respectively. Screening tests are not diagnostic, and concerning screening results should be followed up with invasive diagnostic testing for a confirmed diagnosis. Invasive diagnostic prenatal genetic testing can involve chronic villus sampling (CVS) or amniocentesis. The ACOG recommends genetic screening before pregnancy to all pregnant women planning to have a family. After comprehensive counseling and discussion that acknowledges residual risks, it is important to respect the patients' right of choosing whether or not to pursue any component of genetic testing.

The following are some reasons why a woman might consider her risk of birth defects already to be high enough to warrant skipping screening and going straight for invasive testing:

- Increased risk of fetal aneuploidy based on personal obstetric history or family history affected by aneuploidy
- Increased risk for a known genetic or biochemical disease of the fetus
- Maternal transmissible infectious disease such as rubella or toxoplasma
- Parental request in the context of acute parental anxiety or under exceptional circumstances

==== Patient acceptance ====
Research was conducted to determine how women felt about noninvasive diagnosis of fetal aneuploid using maternal blood. This study was conducted using surveys. It was reported that eighty-two percent of pregnant women and seventy-nine percent of female medical students view this type of diagnosis in a positive light, agreeing that it is important for prenatal care. Overall, women responded optimistically that this form of diagnosis will be available in the future.

Testing methods, by invasiveness
Invasiveness	Test	Comments	Time
Non-invasive	Preimplantation genetic diagnosis (PGD)	During in vitro fertilization (IVF) procedures, it is possible to sample cells from human embryos before implantation. PGD is in itself non-invasive, but IVF usually involves invasive procedures such as transvaginal oocyte retrieval	before implantation
Non-invasive	External examination	Examination of the woman's uterus from outside the body. The uterus is commonly palpated to determine if there are problems with the position of the fetus (i.e. breech position). Fundal height may also be measured.	Second or third trimester
Non-invasive	Ultrasound detection	Commonly dating scans (sometimes known as booking scans or dating ultrasounds) from 7 weeks to confirm pregnancy dates and look for multiple pregnancies. The specialised nuchal scan at 11–13 weeks may be used to identify higher risks of Down syndrome. Later morphology scans, also called anatomy ultrasound, from 18 weeks may check for any abnormal development. Additional ultrasounds may be performed if there are any other problems with the pregnancy, or if the pregnancy is post-due.	First or second trimester
Non-invasive	Fetal heartbeat	Listening to the fetal heartbeat via an external monitor placed on the outside of the abdomen.	First or second trimester
Non-invasive	Non-stress test	Use of cardiotocography during the third trimester to monitor fetal wellbeing.	Third trimester
Non-invasive	Maternal blood pressure	Used to screen for pre-eclampsia throughout the pregnancy.	First, second and third trimester
Non-invasive	Maternal weighing	Unusually low or high maternal weight can indicate problems with the pregnancy.	First, second and third trimesters.
Less invasive	Fetal cells in maternal blood (FCMB)	Requires a maternal blood draw. Based on enrichment of fetal cells which circulate in maternal blood. Since fetal cells hold all the genetic information of the developing fetus, they can be used to perform prenatal diagnosis.	First trimester
Less invasive	Cell-free fetal DNA in maternal blood	Requires a maternal blood draw. Based on DNA of fetal origin circulating in the maternal blood. Testing can potentially identify fetal aneuploidy (available in the United States, beginning 2011) and gender of a fetus as early as six weeks into a pregnancy. Fetal DNA ranges from about 2–10% of the total DNA in maternal blood. Cell-free fetal DNA also allows whole genome sequencing of the fetus, thus determining the complete DNA sequence of every gene.	First trimester
Less invasive	Glucose tolerance testing	Requires a maternal blood draw. Used to screen for gestational diabetes.	Second trimester
Less invasive	Transcervical retrieval of trophoblast cells	Cervical mucus aspiration, cervical swabbing, and cervical or intrauterine lavage can be used to retrieve trophoblast cells for diagnostic purposes, including prenatal genetic analysis. Success rates for retrieving fetal trophoblast cells vary from 40% to 90%. It can be used for fetal sex determination and identify aneuploidies. Antibody markers have proven useful to select trophoblast cells for genetic analysis and to demonstrate that the abundance of recoverable trophoblast cells diminishes in abnormal gestations, such as in ectopic pregnancy or anembryonic gestation.	First trimester
Less invasive	Maternal serum screening	Including β-hCG, PAPP-A, alpha fetoprotein, inhibin-A.	First or second trimester
More invasive	Chorionic villus sampling	Involves getting a sample of the chorionic villus and testing it. This can be done earlier than amniocentesis, but may have a higher risk of miscarriage, estimated at 1%.	After 10 weeks
More invasive	Amniocentesis	This can be done once enough amniotic fluid has developed to sample. Cells from the fetus will be floating in this fluid, and can be separated and tested. Miscarriage risk of amniocentesis is commonly quoted as 0.06% (1:1600). By amniocentesis it is also possible to cryopreserve amniotic stem cells.	After 15 weeks
More invasive	Embryoscopy and fetoscopy	Though rarely done, these involve putting a probe into a women's uterus to observe (with a video camera), or to sample blood or tissue from the embryo or fetus.	
More invasive	Percutaneous umbilical cord blood sampling	PUBS is a diagnostic genetic test that examines blood from the fetal umbilical cord to detect fetal abnormalities.	24–34 weeks

== By pregnancy stage ==
=== Pre-conception ===
Prior to conception, couples may elect to have genetic testing done to determine the odds of conceiving a child with a known genetic anomaly. The most common in the Caucasian population are:

- Cystic fibrosis
- Fragile X syndrome
- Blood disorders such as sickle cell disease
- Tay-Sachs disease
- Spinal muscular atrophy

Hundreds of additional conditions are known and more discovered on a regular basis. However the economic justification for population-wide testing of all known conditions is not well supported, particularly once the cost of possible false positive results and concomitant follow-up testing are taken into account. There are also ethical concerns related to this or any type of genetic testing.

One or both partners may be aware of other family members with these diseases. Testing prior to conception may alleviate concern, prepare the couple for the potential short- or long-term consequences of having a child with the disease, direct the couple toward adoption or foster parenting, or prompt for preimplantation genetic testing during in vitro fertilization. If a genetic disorder is found, professional genetic counseling is usually recommended owing to the host of ethical considerations related to subsequent decisions for the partners and potential impact on their extended families. Most, but not all, of these diseases follow Mendelian inheritance patterns. Fragile X syndrome is related to expansion of certain repeated DNA segments and may change generation-to-generation.

=== First trimester ===
At early presentation of pregnancy at around 6 weeks, early dating ultrasound scan may be offered to help confirm the gestational age of the embryo and check for a single or twin pregnancy, but such a scan is unable to detect common abnormalities. Details of prenatal screening and testing options may be provided.

Around weeks 11–13, nuchal translucency scan (NT) may be offered which can be combined with blood tests for PAPP-A and beta-hCG, two serum markers that correlate with chromosomal abnormalities, in what is called the First Trimester Combined Test. The results of the blood test are then combined with the NT ultrasound measurements, maternal age, and gestational age of the fetus to yield a risk score for Down syndrome, trisomy 18, and trisomy 13. First Trimester Combined Test has a sensitivity (i.e. detection rate for abnormalities) of 82–87% and a false-positive rate of around 5%.

Cell-free fetal DNA screening is also available during the first trimester of pregnancy.

=== Second trimester ===
The anomaly scan is performed between 18 and 22 weeks of gestational age. The International Society of Ultrasound in Obstetrics and Gynecology (ISUOG) recommends that this ultrasound is performed as a matter of routine prenatal care, to measure the fetus so that growth abnormalities can be recognized quickly later in pregnancy, and to assess for congenital malformations and multiple pregnancies (i.e. twins). The scan can detect anencephaly, open spina bifida, cleft lip, diaphragmatic hernia, gastroschisis, omphalocele, congenital heart defect, bilateral renal agenesis, osteochondrodysplasia, Edwards syndrome, and Patau syndrome.

A second-trimester Quad blood test may be taken (the Triple test is widely considered obsolete but in some states, such as Missouri, where Medicaid only covers the Triple test, that's what the patient typically gets). With integrated screening, both a First Trimester Combined Test and a Triple/Quad test is performed, and a report is only produced after both tests have been analyzed. However patients may not wish to wait between these two sets of tests. With sequential screening, a first report is produced after the first trimester sample has been submitted, and a final report after the second sample. With contingent screening, patients at very high or very low risks will get reports after the first-trimester sample has been submitted. Only patients with moderate risk (risk score between 1:50 and 1:2000) will be asked to submit a second-trimester sample, after which they will receive a report combining information from both serum samples and the NT measurement. The First Trimester Combined Test and the Triple/Quad test together have a sensitivity of 88–95% with a 5% false-positive rate for Down syndrome, though they can also be analyzed in such a way as to offer a 90% sensitivity with a 2% false-positive rate. Finally, patients who do not receive an NT ultrasound in the 1st trimester may still receive a Serum Integrated test involving measuring PAPP-A serum levels in the 1st trimester and then doing a Quad test in the 2nd trimester. This offers an 85–88% sensitivity and 5% false-positive rate for Down syndrome. Also, a patient may skip the 1st-trimester screening entirely and receive only a 2nd-trimester Quad test, with an 81% sensitivity for Down syndrome and 5% false-positive rate.

=== Third trimester ===
Third-trimester prenatal testing generally focuses on maternal wellbeing and reducing fetal morbidity/mortality. Group B streptococcal infection (also called Group B strep) may be offered, which is a major cause of neonatal morbidity and mortality. Group B strep is an infection that may be passed to an infant during birth. Vaginal screening for GBS is performed between 34 and 37 weeks of gestational age, so that mothers that are positive for the bacterium can receive treatment before delivery. During the third trimester, some institutions may require evaluations of hemoglobin/hematocrit, syphilis serology, and HIV screening. Also, before delivery, an assessment of fetal position and estimated fetal weight is documented.

== Legislation ==
=== In Europe ===
Prenatal diagnosis (DPN) is permitted throughout Europe, with the exception of Ireland. Eight (8) countries have no legislation on this matter. However, there are differences between states. For instance, in Poland, the deadline for DPN is 22 weeks. In Malta, the Parliamentary Social Affairs Committee specified in its 2005 report that DPN should only be allowed for conditions for which therapeutic options exist. Nevertheless, all countries prohibit DPN for non-medical purposes (such as sex selection), for example.

In February 2010, Germany passed the Genetic Diagnostics Act (Gendiagnostikgesetz) to regulate the use of genetic tests and data in medicine and to ensure patient consent and confidentiality. It regulated human genetic testing like prenatal testing on a case-by-case basis to prevent genetic discrimination and eugenic misuse of reproductive technology.

In France, Article L2131-1 of the Public Health Code, stemming from the July 2011 bioethics law, states that "prenatal diagnosis refers to medical practices, including obstetric and fetal ultrasound, aimed at detecting, in utero, a particularly severe condition in the embryo or fetus." The law requires that pregnant women receive clear information about these techniques to "assess the risk that the embryo or fetus may have a condition that could alter the course or management of the pregnancy.

=== In North America ===
In October 2008, the United States passed the Prenatally and Postnatally Diagnosed Conditions Awareness Act to increase patient referrals and information about support services available for parents who receive a positive prenatal diagnosis for Down Syndrome and other prenatally or postnatally diagnosed conditions.

== Ethical and practical issues ==
=== Non-genetic prenatal testing ===
Parents need to make informed decisions about screening, diagnosis, and any actions to be taken as a result. Many screening tests are inaccurate, so one worrisome test result frequently leads to additional, more invasive tests. If prenatal testing confirms a serious disability, many parents are forced to decide whether to continue the pregnancy or seek an abortion. The "option" of screening becomes an unexpected requirement to decide.

In some genetic conditions, for instance cystic fibrosis, an abnormality can only be detected if DNA is obtained from the fetus. Usually an invasive method is needed to do this.

Ultrasound of a fetus, which is considered a screening test, can sometimes miss subtle abnormalities. For example, studies show that a detailed 2nd-trimester ultrasound, also called a level 2 ultrasound, can detect about 97% of neural tube defects such as spina bifida. Ultrasound results may also show "soft signs," such as an Echogenic intracardiac focus or a Choroid plexus cyst, which are usually normal, but can be associated with an increased risk for chromosome abnormalities.

Other screening tests, such as the Quad test, can also have false positives and false negatives. Even when the Quad results are positive (or, to be more precise, when the Quad test yields a score that shows at least a 1 in 270 risk of abnormality), usually the pregnancy is normal, but additional diagnostic tests are offered. In fact, consider that Down syndrome affects about 1:400 pregnancies; if you screened 4000 pregnancies with a Quad test, there would probably be 10 Down syndrome pregnancies of which the Quad test, with its 80% sensitivity, would call 8 of them high-risk. The quad test would also tell 5% (~200) of the 3990 normal women that they are high-risk. Therefore, about 208 women would be told they are high-risk, but when they undergo an invasive test, only 8 (or 4% of the high risk pool) will be confirmed as positive and 200 (96%) will be told that their pregnancies are normal. Since amniocentesis has approximately a 0.5% chance of miscarriage, one of those 200 normal pregnancies might result in a miscarriage because of the invasive procedure. Meanwhile, of the 3792 women told they are low-risk by the Quad test, 2 of them will go on to deliver a baby with Down syndrome. The Quad test is therefore said to have a 4% positive predictive value (PPV) because only 4% of women who are told they are "high-risk" by the screening test actually have an affected fetus. The other 96% of the women who are told they are "high-risk" find out that their pregnancy is normal.

By comparison, in the same 4000 women, a screening test that has a 99% sensitivity and a 0.5% false positive rate would detect all 10 positives while telling 20 normal women that they are positive. Therefore, 30 women would undergo a confirmatory invasive procedure and 10 of them (33%) would be confirmed as positive and 20 would be told that they have a normal pregnancy. Of the 3970 women told by the screen that they are negative, none of the women would have an affected pregnancy. Therefore, such a screen would have a 33% positive predictive value.

The real-world false-positive rate for the Quad test (as well as 1st Trimester Combined, Integrated, etc.) is greater than 5%. 5% was the rate quoted in the large clinical studies that were done by the best researchers and physicians, where all the ultrasounds were done by well-trained sonographers and the gestational age of the fetus was calculated as closely as possible. In the real world, where calculating gestational age may be a less precise art, the formulas that generate a patient's risk score are not as accurate and the false-positive rate can be higher, even 10%.

Because of the low accuracy of conventional screening tests, 5–10% of women, often those who are older, will opt for an invasive test even if they received a low-risk score from the screening. A patient who received a 1:330 risk score, while technically low-risk (since the cutoff for high-risk is commonly quoted as 1:270), might be more likely to still opt for a confirmatory invasive test. On the other hand, a patient who receives a 1:1000 risk score is more likely to feel assuaged that her pregnancy is normal.

Both false positives and false negatives will have a large impact on a couple when they are told the result, or when the child is born. Diagnostic tests, such as amniocentesis, are considered to be very accurate for the defects they check for, though even these tests are not perfect, with a reported 0.2% error rate (often due to rare abnormalities such as mosaic Down syndrome where only some of the fetal/placental cells carry the genetic abnormality).

A higher maternal serum AFP level indicates a greater risk for anencephaly and open spina bifida. This screening is 80% and 90% sensitive for spina bifida and anencephaly, respectively.

Amniotic fluid acetylcholinesterase and AFP level are more sensitive and specific than AFP in predicting neural tube defects.

Many maternal-fetal specialists do not bother to even do an AFP test on their patients because they do a detail ultrasound on all of them in the 2nd trimester, which has a 97% detection rate for neural tube defects such as anencephaly and open spina bifida. Performing tests to determine possible birth defects is mandatory in all U.S. states. Failure to detect issues early can have dangerous consequences on both the mother and the baby. OBGYNs may be held culpable. In one case a man who was born with spina bifida was awarded $2 million in settlement, apart from medical expenses, due to the OBGYN's negligence in conducting AFP tests.

No prenatal test can detect all forms of birth defects and abnormalities.

=== Prenatal genetic testing ===
Another important issue is the uncertainty of prenatal genetic testing. Uncertainty on genetic testing results from several reasons: the genetic test is associated with a disease but the prognosis and/or probability is unknown, the genetic test provides information different than the familiar disease they tested for, found genetic variants have unknown significance, and finally, results may not be associated with found fetal abnormalities. Richardson and Ormond thoroughly addressed the issue of uncertainty of genetic testing and explained its implication for bioethics. First, the principle of beneficence is assumed in prenatal testing by decreasing the risk of miscarriage, however, uncertain information derived from genetic testing may harm the parents by provoking anxiety and leading to the termination of a fetus that is probably healthy. Second, the principle of autonomy is undermined given a lack of comprehension resulting from new technologies and changing knowledge in the field of genetics. And third, the principle of justice raised issues regarding equal access to emerging prenatal tests.

=== Availability of treatments ===
If a genetic disease is detected, there is often no treatment that can help the fetus until it is born. However, in the US, there are prenatal surgeries for spina bifida fetus. Early diagnosis gives the parents time to research and discuss post-natal treatment and care, or in some cases, abortion. Genetic counselors are usually called upon to help families make informed decisions regarding results of prenatal diagnosis.

=== Patient education ===
Researchers have studied how disclosing amniocentesis or chorionic villous sampling (CVS) results on a fixed date versus a variable date (i.e. "when available") affects maternal anxiety. Systematic review of the relevant articles found no conclusive evidence to support issuing amniocentesis results as soon as they become available (in comparison to issuing results on a pre-defined fixed date). The researchers concluded that further studies evaluating the effect of different strategies for disclosing CVS results on maternal anxiety are needed.

=== Concerns from disability rights activists and scholars ===
Since its introduction in 2011 to 2025, there has been a global expansion of non-invasive prenatal testing (NIPT). Initially, only women at-high risk for chromosomal abnormalities underwent NIPT, however in recent years it has become routine during pregnancy. NIPT is especially accurate at detecting trisomy 21, also known as Down's Syndrome, which is the most common form of chromosomal disorder in live births. In England, Wales, and Scotland abortion due to disability is legal under the Abortion Act of 1967. In the US, it is estimated that NIPT has potentially led to a 30% decrease of people living with Down's Syndrome.

Disability rights activists and scholars have suggested a more critical view of prenatal testing not as a test itself but rather for its implications for people with disabilities. In a Hastings Center project, bioethicists Erik Parens and Adrienne Asch discussed the ableist implications of prenatal testing and the subsequent selective abortions of fetuses identified as having undesirable, disabling conditions. Access to prenatal testing could potentially result in the abortion of fetuses that might be born with disabilities, as a result of medical and social pressures that rely on eugenics interests and ableist stereotypes. This selective abortion relies on discriminatory attitudes claiming that people with disabilities cannot live desirable lives, that they will not be able to flourish and that they are burdens to their families. Activists argue that inevitably societal perceptions about disabilities will influence the decision to terminate a pregnancy. For this reason, Marsha Saxton suggests that families should question whether or not they are relying on real, factual information about people with disabilities or on stereotypes if they decide to abort a fetus with a disability.

While there is a general consensus amongst disability scholars that it is reasonable to screen for fatal conditions such as Tay Sachs, there is debate about where to draw the line regarding prenatal testing, and what conditions it is and is not acceptable to screen for. Sociologist Troy Duster criticized the unevenly distributed genetic screening methods applied to different racial and ethnic target populations—with Tay-Sachs among Jews typically being voluntary and sickle-cell among African Americans once being compulsory. Both Duster and disability scholars have criticized the growing reliance on genetic screening methods like prenatal testing as overemphasizing the role of genetics in disability and disease, while ignoring the social, economic, and environmental inequalities that impact health.

=== Societal pressures ===
Amniocentesis has become the standard of care for prenatal care visits for women who are "at risk" or over a certain age. The wide use of amniocentesis has been defined as consumeristic. and some argue that this can be in conflict with the right to privacy, Most obstetricians (depending on the country) offer patients the AFP triple test, HIV test, and ultrasounds routinely. However, almost all women meet with a genetic counselor before deciding whether to have prenatal diagnosis. It is the role of the genetic counselor to accurately inform women of the risks and benefits of prenatal diagnosis. Genetic counselors are trained to be non-directive and to support the patient's decision. Some doctors do advise women to have certain prenatal tests and the patient's partner may also influence the woman's decision.

=== Racial Discrimination ===
Black women and women of color present moderate to high levels of mistrust in healthcare professionals. Nearly half of black women reported being treated unfairly by healthcare professionals on the basis of race. Black women and women of color are not extremely knowledgeable on topics of prenatal testing, and attitudes towards less invasive prenatal screenings are far more positive than attitudes towards more invasive prenatal testing. The more negative attitudes towards prenatal testing are surmised to be partially caused by the mistrust in healthcare professionals, as well as the possible miscarriage risks of invasive prenatal testing.

Racial discrimination is also present in the process and outcomes of prenatal testing. Currently 3 prenatal tests use race as a risk factor as well as to assess results; blood pressure screening for hypertensive disorders, first trimester combined aneuploidy testing, and second trimester quadruple aneuploidy testing. And before now, 3 other tests previously included race as a factor; gestational diabetes, anemia, and hemoglobinopathies. Using race to help determine biological outcomes assumes that race is a biological fact instead of a social construction, which only further perpetuates the ideas of racism and racial differences. Including race in prenatal testing can also cause improper medical care, such as over medicalization, or missing a diagnosis because it was not considered to be tested for.

== Legal ==
In June 2022, the Iranian government directed medical professionals to "stop recommending antenatal screening tests," requiring patients to specifically request the testing instead.

== See also ==
- Amniocentesis
- Amniotic stem cell bank
- Amniotic stem cells
- Chorionic villi
- Genetic counseling
- Newborn screening
- Prenatal screening for autism
