= Major basic protein =

PRG2

Identifiers
- Aliases: PRG2, BMPG, MBP, MBP1, proteoglycan 2, bone marrow (natural killer cell activator, eosinophil granule major basic protein), proMBP, proteoglycan 2, pro eosinophil major basic protein
- External IDs: OMIM: 605601; MGI: 103294; GeneCards: PRG2
Available structures
PDB	Ortholog search: PDBe RCSB
PDB	List of PDB id codes 1H8U, 2BRS, 4QXX

Gene location (Human)
Chr.	Chromosome 11 (human)
Band	11q12.1	Start	57,386,780 bp
Band	11q12.1	End	57,390,650 bp

Gene location (Mouse)
Chr.	Chromosome 2 (mouse)
Band	2 D|2 49.45 cM	Start	84,810,805 bp
Band	2 D|2 49.45 cM	End	84,813,976 bp
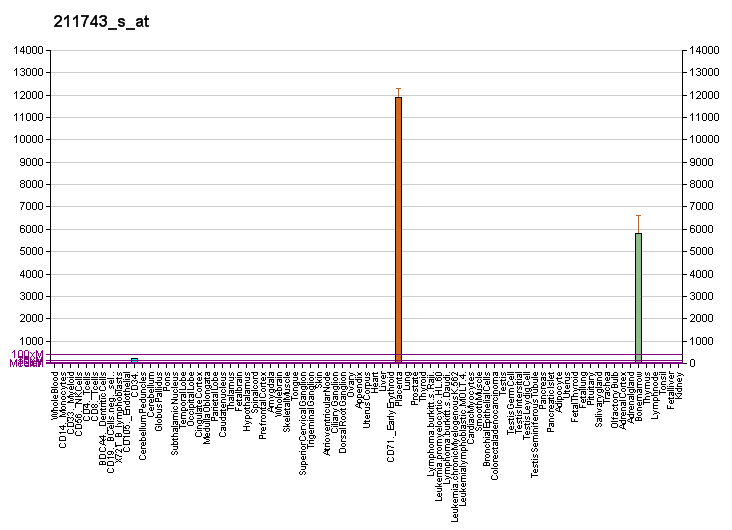
RNA expression pattern
Bgee	Human / Mouse (ortholog); Top expressed in: placenta; bone marrow; bone marrow cell; right lobe of liver; skin of leg; subcutaneous adipose tissue; spleen; skin of abdomen; monocyte; blood / Top expressed in: tibiofemoral joint; granulocyte; fetal liver hematopoietic progenitor cell; bone marrow; embryo; embryo; ankle joint; spleen; human fetus; vestibular membrane of cochlear duct; More reference expression data
BioGPS	More reference expression data
Gene ontology
Molecular function	heparin binding; carbohydrate binding; extracellular matrix structural constituent conferring compression resistance
Cellular component	extracellular region; transport vesicle; cytoplasmic vesicle; extracellular exosome; ficolin-1-rich granule lumen; collagen-containing extracellular matrix
Biological process	defense response to bacterium; immune system process; defense response to nematode; negative regulation of interleukin-10 production; positive regulation of interleukin-4 production; immune response; neutrophil degranulation
Sources:Amigo / QuickGO
Orthologs
Databases	NCBI: entry; OMA: entry
Species	Human	Mouse
Entrez	5553	19074
Ensembl	ENSG00000186652	ENSMUSG00000027073
UniProt	P13727	Q61878
RefSeq (mRNA)	NM_002728; NM_001243245; NM_001302926; NM_001302927	NM_008920
RefSeq (protein)	NP_001230174; NP_001289855; NP_001289856; NP_002719	NP_032946
Location (UCSC)	Chr 11: 57.39 – 57.39 Mb	Chr 2: 84.81 – 84.81 Mb
PubMed search
- Wikidata
View/Edit Human	View/Edit Mouse

Eosinophil major basic protein, often shortened to major basic protein (MBP; also called proteoglycan 2 (PRG2)) is encoded in humans by the PRG2 gene.

== Function ==
The protein encoded by this gene is the predominant constituent of the crystalline core of the eosinophil granule. High levels of the proform of this protein are also present in placenta and pregnancy serum, where it exists as a complex with several other proteins including pregnancy-associated plasma protein A (PAPPA), angiotensinogen (AGT), and C3dg. This protein may be involved in antiparasitic defense mechanisms as a cytotoxin and helmintho-toxin, and in immune hypersensitivity reactions. It is directly implicated in epithelial cell damage, exfoliation, and bronchospasm in allergic diseases.

PRG2 is a 117-residue protein that predominates in eosinophil granules. It is a potent enzyme against helminths and is toxic towards bacteria and mammalian cells in vitro. The eosinophil major basic protein also causes the release of histamine from mast cells and basophils, and activates neutrophils and alveolar macrophages.

== Structure ==
Structurally the major basic protein (MBP) is similar to lectins (sugar-binding proteins), and has a fold similar to that seen in C-type lectins. However, unlike other C-type lectins (those that bind various carbohydrates in the presence of calcium), MBP does not bind either calcium or any of the other carbohydrates that this family recognize.

Instead, MBP recognises heparan sulfate proteoglycans. Two crystallographic structures of MBP have been determined.

== Interactions ==
Major basic protein has been shown to interact with pregnancy-associated plasma protein A.

== See also ==
- Arylsulfatase
