= Disability-selective abortion =

Disability-selective abortion is the abortion of fetuses that are found to have non-fatal mental or physical defects detected through prenatal testing. Since the advent of forms of prenatal diagnosis, such as amniocentesis and ultrasound, it has become possible to detect the presence of congenital disorders in the fetus before birth. Many prenatal tests are now considered routine, such as testing for Down syndrome. Women who are discovered to be carrying fetuses with disabilities are often faced with the decision of whether to abort or to prepare to parent a child with disabilities. Discussion of disability-selective abortion is an extension of the abortion debate and the disability rights movement.

== Terminology ==
Genetic abnormalities can be detected at various stages of pregnancy. Preimplantation refers to the state of existing or occurring between the fertilization of an ovum and its implantation in the wall of the uterus. Preimplantation genetic diagnosis is when one or both parents have a known genetic abnormality and testing is done on an embryo to determine if it also carries the genetic abnormality. Preimplantation is an IVF-specific practice. IVF, or in vitro fertilization, is when mature eggs are collected from ovaries and fertilized by sperm in a lab and then transferred to a uterus. Preimplantation genetic testing tests IVF embryos before pregnancy and Preimplantation genetic screening screens non-IVF embryos for aneuploidy. Aneuploidy is a chromosome mutation in which the number of chromosomes is abnormal and differs from the usual 46 chromosomes.

Embryo selection is very similar to preimplantation in which embryos are tested or diagnosed, but embryo selection involves the act of selecting an embryo which does not have any abnormalities to be later implanted into the wall of the uterus to initiate pregnancy. Embryo screening prevents the implantation of embryos that would be carrying chromosomal abnormalities that are likely to cause a pregnancy to abort.

Preimplantation and embryo selection require medical professionals to test chromosomal and genetic defects in the embryo to see if the embryo will be viable when implanted in the uterus.

There are also methods of prenatal genetic screening that can be employed after conception, regardless of whether IVF was used. These types of screenings are classified into two groups: invasive prenatal screening and non-invasive prenatal screening.

Invasive techniques involve the insertion of a needle or probe into the uterus for sample collection. Common invasive tests are amniocentesis, the screening of amniotic fluid from the uterus, and chorionic villus sampling, which involves testing fluid from the chorionic villi lining the uterine wall. These procedures pose a higher risk for the mother and child, but are sometimes necessary.

Non-invasive techniques do not involve puncturing of the uterus, and are much safer for the mother and child. Common examples of non-invasive testing are ultrasound and cell-free placental DNA tests, which was developed and implemented in the United States and Western Europe in late 2011. For genetic screening, the latter is most commonly used. Cell-free placental DNA testing is also known as NIPS or NIPT (non-invasive prenatal screening/testing), and involves testing of maternal blood via venipuncture, where placental blood is present. Certain genetic aberrations can be detected through this process, including Down syndrome and other aneuploidies.

== Legality of selective abortion ==
In many countries abortion is available upon request up to a certain point in the pregnancy, not taking into account why the mother wants the abortion, but in a small number of countries all abortions are prohibited, including for those pregnancies that risk the mother's life, including Vatican City, El Salvador, and Malta. Countries may also restrict abortion even if the baby has a genetic defect. Countries that allow abortion if the mother is at risk but do not allow abortion if the fetus has a genetic defect include Iran, Ireland, Mexico, and the Dominican Republic.

Not all genetic markers which can be checked are for disease, leaving open the possibility that parents may choose an abortion based on personal preference rather than avoidance of disease. In some jurisdictions, sex-selective abortion is specifically prohibited. Some anti-abortion activists are concerned that genetic testing will give women excuses to get abortions. It is believed that eventually genetic testing will be able to provide a wealth of knowledge on the future health of the child.

The political and economic factors surrounding legal restrictions on disability-selective abortion have also been studied. Denbow studied prenatal nondiscrimination laws in the United States, focusing on the debates in four states that enacted laws before 2019, North Dakota, Ohio, Illinois, and Louisiana. She states that some conservatives have used arguments about protecting people with disabilities to support restrictions on disability-selected abortion. Denbow further argues that the laws place a responsibility for more social and economic concerns on individuals who are pregnant, rather than the role of the government limiting the funding for disability services.

== Genetic testing ==
Screening for Down syndrome is offered as a routine part of prenatal care in some countries. The American Congress of Obstetricians and Gynecologists recommends offering various screening tests for Down syndrome to all pregnant women, regardless of age. Genetic testing, however, is not completely accurate, but it can help to determine if further tests should be administered or if there should be concern. Testing for Down Syndrome can be conducted at different times of the pregnancy. Most women choose to do so in the first trimester, which is done in two parts at the 11th and 13th week of pregnancy. These tests include an ultrasound to measure a certain area on the back of the fetus's neck. An excess of fluid in this area could indicate a medical issue with the fetus. The second part of the test is a blood test which looks for abnormal levels of PAPP-A and bHCG, which may indicate a problem with the fetus.

=== Effect on births ===
Since the development of non-invasive prenatal testing (NIPT), multiple studies have investigated whether the number of those born with Down syndrome has been affected. One 2020 European study found that NIPT reduced the number of babies being born per year with Down syndrome (DS) by an average of 54%. In 2016, the same research team found that 33% fewer babies were born with Down syndrome per year in the United States as a result of disability selective abortions.

Statistics today conclude that 90 percent of fetuses that are diagnosed with Down syndrome via fetal genetic testing are aborted. However, only 2-3 percent of women agree to completing genetic testing, CVS or amniocentesis, the current tests for chromosomal abnormalities. When taking this into account, it is believed that approximately 50 percent of fetuses with Down Syndrome are aborted.

One notable case is that of Denmark, where prenatal testing has been widely adopted and disability selective abortion is common. In 2004, Denmark became one of the first countries in the world to offer prenatal screening for Down syndrome to any woman who requests it. Almost all women choose to have this screening, and of those who do and receive a positive diagnosis, 95% percent choose to abort. Since nation-wide testing was first offered, the number of babies born to parents who chose to continue a pregnancy after a prenatal diagnosis of Down syndrome in Denmark has fluctuated from zero to 13 per year.

=== Response by advocates ===
Fetuses with Down syndrome are disproportionately affected by genetic pre-screening, as current statistics indicate that 50% of fetuses with Down syndrome are aborted. Down Syndrome activists have responded to this disparity by testifying to Congress and raising awareness regarding links between Down Syndrome and Alzheimer's research.

Actor and Special Olympian Frank Stephens is one of the most prominent Down syndrome advocates. He has testified before Congress to argue for appropriating funds to support research that would benefit individuals diagnosed with the disease. The primary organization he promotes in his work is The Global Down Syndrome Foundation. Its work centers on addressing research on conditions that disproportionately affect people with Down Syndrome, including congenital heart conditions, sleep apnea, and Alzheimer's disease.

Approximately 50% of the Down syndrome population will develop Alzheimer's in their later years. Alzheimer's disease is characterized by the buildup of amyloid precursor protein and subsequent beta-amyloid plaques in the brain. Although most individuals with Down syndrome have these plaques by age 40, not all people with Down syndrome develop Alzheimer's. Therefore, the Down syndrome population offers a unique quality to researchers to investigate why some individuals with Down syndrome develop Alzheimer's and others do not.

Above all, Down syndrome advocates want parents to make an informed choice before terminating a Down syndrome pregnancy. In other words, rather than promoting a "pro-life" or "pro-choice" stance, these advocates encourage people to adopt a "pro-information" stance. These proponents believe that a Down syndrome diagnosis should be the start of learning about life with Down syndrome and promote more balanced, positive education about Down syndrome in clinics.

== Support for disability-selective abortion ==
Support for disability-selective abortions stems partially from arguments that those born with disabilities have a quality of life that is reduced to the extent that non-existence is preferable, and terminating the pregnancy is actually for the sake of the fetus. Some argue that abortion of fetuses with disabilities is moral in that it prevents the child or parents from suffering, and that the decision to abort is not made lightly. One such example comes from the utilitarian perspective of Peter Singer who argues that abortion of healthy fetuses is not justified, but that disability-selective abortions are justified if the total amount of happiness will be greater by doing so. His justification for such line of thinking comes not only from the quality of life for the child, but also the suffering of the parents and lack of willing adoptive parents for children with disabilities.

Many feminists and reproductive rights activists also oppose selective abortion bans. When describing their oppositions, these activists usually do not say they favor selective abortions in and of themselves, but oppose selective-abortion bans because these laws conflict with reproductive rights.

Feminist arguments on the topic largely oppose viewing disability selective abortions as a moral failure, but rather as a means for livelihood. Many argue that the motivation to terminate a pregnancy stems not from a lack of perspective on what the quality of life for someone with a disability can be, but rather from the additional time, stress, and money necessary to raise a child with a disability, or for reasons entirely unrelated to disability. In a feminist scholarly article Claire McKinney quotes a 1999 study, finding that 76% of surveyed mothers who did not have a child with Down syndrome were employed, compared to 56% of those who did. A separate 2008 study found that families living below the poverty line with children who have disabilities are "more likely to experience material deprivation, such as food insecurity, housing instability, lack of health care access, and telephone disconnection" than are families living below the poverty line without children with disabilities. The prevalent feminist argument is that reproductive rights and right to unhindered abortion are essential in disability-selective abortions for the same reasons that they are essential in any abortion: no woman should be forced into a situation that may have severe financial, mental, or professional impact on her.

Feminists argue how cultural expectations can influence reproductive decisions when discovering a diagnosis of Down syndrome. Knight and Miller argue that expectations of who should be responsible for raising children can limit women's decisions about bearing and child and reproducing. Particularly, the cultural expectation of being a good mother and having proper children can shape how someone is adequate to raise a child who has a disability. The expectations are reinforced by social constructs of attitudes towards disabilities, as it creates a burden on the mother to achieve these level when lacking in support is not evenly distributed. The authors argue that these reproductive decisions are therefore not only influenced by medical information but also their social environment.

Reproductive rights activists say that selective-abortion bans do not serve to save people with disabilities but instead, seek to incrementally restrict abortion. Incremental restrictions on abortion take the form of legislation that codify specific rules limiting access to abortion without outright violating the Supreme Court ruling in Planned Parenthood v. Casey (1992). In that case, the courts ruled that states cannot place an "undue burden" on the right to abortion before fetal viability. Accordingly, anti-abortion groups advocate for laws like perinatal hospice laws, which mandate the provision of fetal life-sustaining resources for people with fatal pregnancies. Measures like perinatal hospital laws materially impact the accessibility of abortion without outright banning the procedure and thus often avoid being classified as "undue burdens" on abortion before viability. Groups like Americans United for Life have been very successful in making abortion more difficult to access through the incremental approach. Therefore, reproductive rights activists are wary of incremental abortion bans and see selective abortion bans as such.

== Opposition to disability-selective abortion ==
Several different arguments lie at the heart of opposition to disability-selective abortions. Those against disability-selective abortions often quote the right to life of all fetuses. Further arguments include that such abortions are based on misinformation or stereotypes about the lives of people with disabilities. Others consider the abortion of fetuses with disabilities a form of discrimination, arguing that abortion after a positive diagnosis sends the message that a life with a disability is not worth living. Disability and feminist activists warn against the eugenic possibilities of disability-selective abortions for the disabled community. Reproductive rights activists not only fight for women's right to abortion but also for their right to choose not to use prenatal testing. A notable pro-choice supporter who condemned disability-selective abortion was Adrienne Asch, who believed that perceived problems associated with disability were not attributable to the disability itself but an absence of social support and acceptance.

Feminists have also questioned how society defines bodily normalities and abnormalities in selective abortion. Mills examines a case where a pregnancy was aborted after a prenatal ultrasound, as it was discovered that it was missing a hand. Referencing philosophy, she argues that someone with this deformation could still be considered normal and live a supported life, but may suffer from social differences. Simultaneously, they explain how this case demonstrates how disability-selective abortion and sex-selective abortion are closely linked. Arguing how the ethical questions surrounding these forms of abortion are based on physical characteristics of the fetus, and can have greater influences on the reproductive decision.

- The European Blind Union has stated its opposition to compulsory abortion for genetic indications in its manifesto: "the right to life shall include the prohibition of compulsory abortion at the instance of the State, based on the prenatal diagnosis of disability".
- According to an article in Disability Studies Quarterly, the disability rights movement in Germany has disapproved of abortion in cases in which the fetus is found to have a congenital defect. This issue for the German disability-rights movement has continuity going back to the early eugenics movement, through to the Nazi era, when Nazi eugenic practices became a concern, and on into the present.
- A report given to the NSW Anti-Discrimination Board and NSW Law Reform Commission by the AIS Support Group of Australia (AISSGA) reviewed the Australian incidence of abortion in cases when the fetus was diagnosed with a disorder of sexual development. Between 1983 and 1998, the Victorian Department of Human Services reported that 98 out of 213 fetuses detected to have Turner syndrome had been aborted, 28 out of 77 found to have Klinefelter syndrome, and 39 out of 189 fetuses with sex chromosome anomalies had been aborted. The AISSGA proposed that parents expecting a baby with sex chromosome anomalies be advised by a genetic counselor, and be given contact with support groups for people with these conditions, to gain a better understanding of the actual effects of the conditions.

== See also ==
- Eugenics
- Fetal rights
- Genetic counselling
