= Choroid plexus cyst =

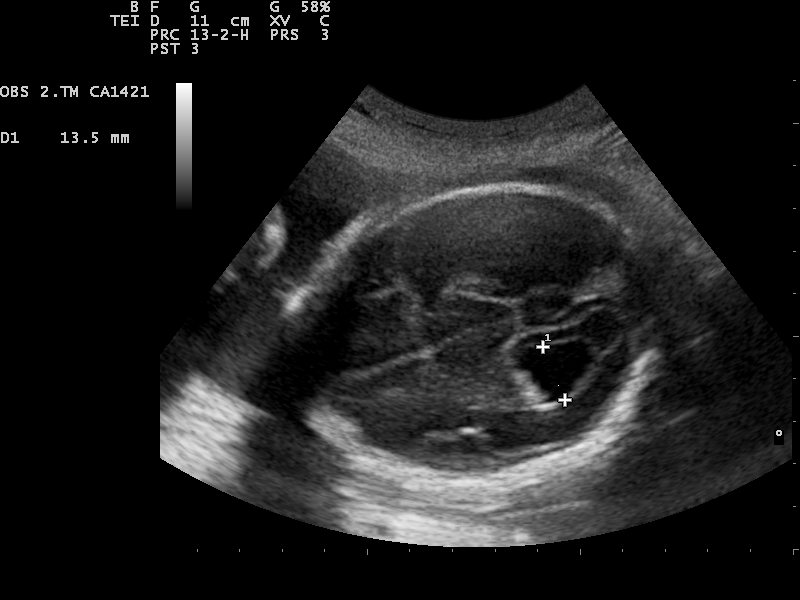
- Prenatal ultrasound showing a well defined hypoechoic lesion corresponding to a choroid plexus cyst
- Specialty: Neurosurgery

Choroid plexus cysts (CPCs) are cysts that occur within choroid plexus of the brain. They are the most common type of intraventricular cyst, occurring in 1% of all pregnancies.

It is believed that many adults have one or more tiny CPCs. The fetal brain may create these cysts as a normal part of development. They are temporary and usually are gone by the 32nd week of pregnancy.

CPCs are a rare cause of intermittent hydrocephalus. This is caused by a blockage of foramina within the ventricular drainage system of the central nervous system (CNS), which can lead to expansion of the ventricles, compressing the brain (the cranial cavity cannot expand to accommodate the increase in fluid volume) and possibly causing damage.

== Pathology ==
The brain contains pockets or spaces called ventricles with a spongy layer of cells and blood vessels called the choroid plexus. This is in the middle of the fetal brain. The choroid plexus has the important function of producing cerebrospinal fluid. The fluid produced by the cells of the choroid plexus fills the ventricles and then flows around the brain and the spinal cord to provide a cushion of fluid around these structures.

CPCs can form within this structure and come from fluid trapped within this spongy layer of cells, much like a soap bubble or a blister. CPCs are often called "soft signs" or fetal ultrasound "markers" because some studies have found a weak association between CPCs and fetal chromosome abnormalities.

Choroid plexus cysts are usually asymptomatic and disappears by 26 to 28 weeks of pregnancy. However, large cysts can cause hydrocephalus.

== Genetic causes ==
There is a possible association between ultrasound-detected fetal CPCs and Trisomy 18. It is not correlated to the presence of Trisomy 21 (Down syndrome). Therefore, genetic counseling is often recommended to provide more information about fetal CPCs, to answer questions and concerns, and to outline available options such as amniocentesis or a blood test from the mother.

Generally the risks are very low if there are no other risk factors. If no additional abnormalities are detected by a thorough "level II" ultrasound, the likelihood the fetus has trisomy 18 is very low.

A meta-analysis of 8 studies between 1990 and 2000 with choroid plexus cysts that were identified in second-trimester (an incidence of 1.2%). The incidence of the cysts in women younger than 35 was 1% (n=1017). The study found no cases of trisomy 18 in fetuses with cysts whose mother was younger than 35. The study concluded that "there is no evidence that detection of isolated choroid plexus cyst in women who are <35 years of age increases the risk of trisomy 18".

Other factors which may have a bearing on the baby's chances of developing chromosome problems include:

- mother's age at the expected date of delivery
- the results of serum screening; XAFP triple testing or quad screening
- evidence of other "fetal findings" seen at the time of the ultrasound that may suggest a chromosome problem
