= Invasive test =

An invasive test is a type of medical procedure that requires trained medical providers to use instruments that cut skin (or other connective tissue) or that are inserted into a body opening. Examples of invasive tests include biopsy, excision, cryotherapy, and endoscopy.

== Invasive versus non-invasive tests ==
The major difference between invasive and non-invasive tests is that invasive tests are done by cutting or entering a body part using medical instruments, whereas non-invasive tests do not require breaking the skin or entering the body. Non-invasive tests include deep palpation, x-rays, and checking blood pressure.

=== Examples ===
- Cardiac catheterization is an invasive procedure that allows physicians to examine the heart of a patient. During this procedure, a physician measures the pressure inside the heart, evaluates arteries delivering blood to the heart, and observes how well the heart is pumping.
- Balloon angioplasty is an invasive test that helps to treat any blockage present in the coronary arteries. A catheter with a small balloon is inserted into the blocked artery and dilated to open the artery that supplies the heart muscle with blood.
- An atherectomy is an invasive procedure performed for removing atherosclerosis from blood vessels within the body. The narrowed arteries are widened by inserting a catheter carrying a device such as a rotating drill or a cutter into the artery.
- Placement of a coronary stent (a cylinder of wire mesh that is placed in a previously blocked artery to ensure that it stays open) is an invasive medical procedure. It is usually placed by a catheter (tube).

== Equipment ==
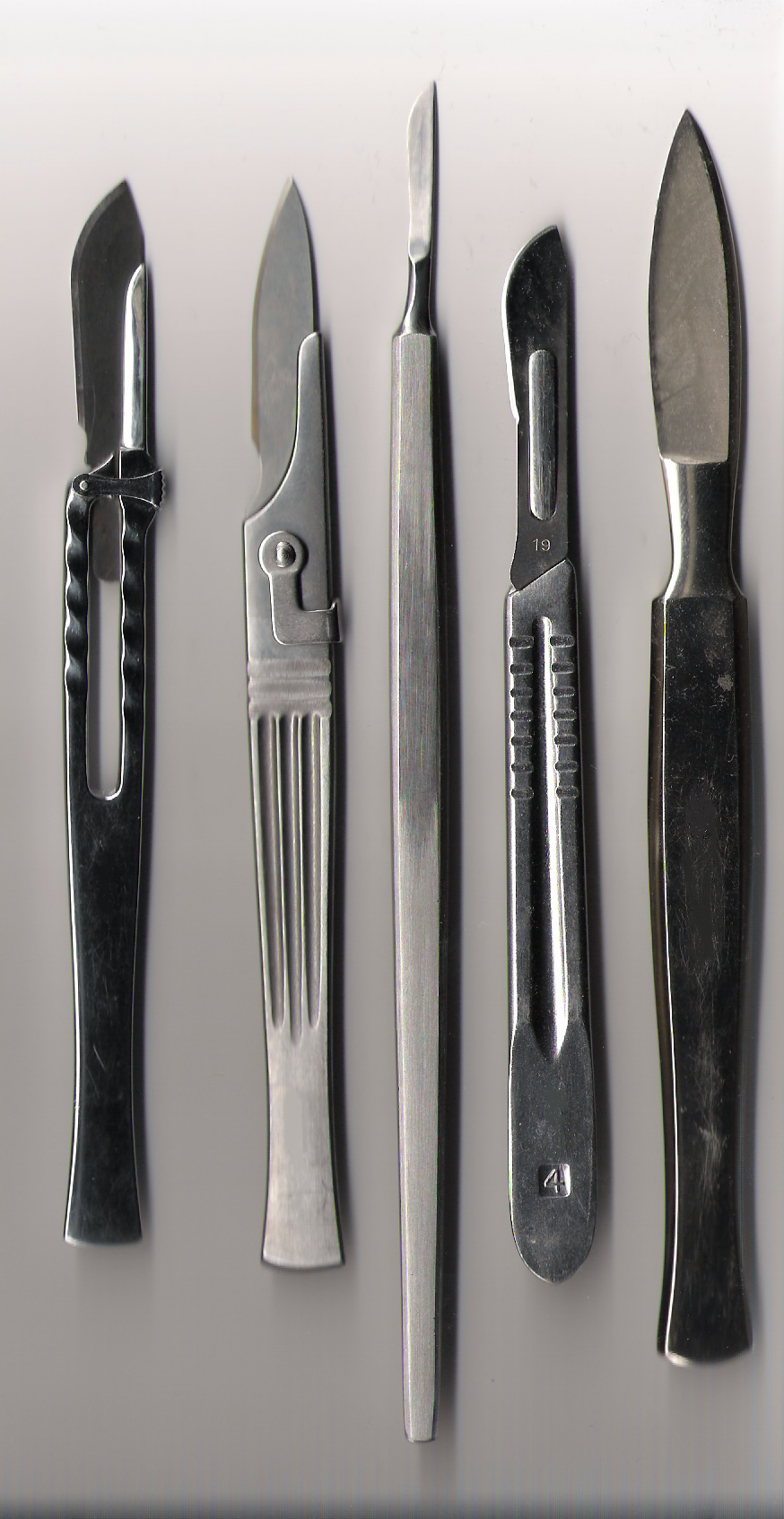
Scalpels are used in some common invasive procedures.

There are various types of equipment used for performing invasive procedures, with each instrument's shape and size depending on what body part needs surgery. Some instruments are hand-held tools and are made of carbon steel, aluminum, or titanium which are used by skilled physicians to perform surgical tasks. Commonly used medical equipment includes scalpels, forceps, scissors, clamps, and retractors. Some surgical procedures require a specific set of equipment. For example, in some orthopedic surgery cases, bone saws, files, mallets, and drills are required.

== Medical application of invasive tests ==
Invasive tests have numerous applications in the field of dentistry, prenatal testing, cancer diagnosis, neurology, cosmetic surgery, etc. because they provide opportunities for doctors to diagnose and treat different kinds of diseases.

== Safety of patient during an invasive procedure ==
In order to perform an invasive test or surgery it is important that the procedure, as with any medical procedure, should be performed in a sterile environment, such as a well-equipped operating room or intensive care unit. Careful attention must be given to the timing of procedures. Early diagnosis will result in more effective treatment and will save both the patient and the hospital time and money. Careful monitoring of the patient is necessary such as checking their heart rate and blood pressure as well as their mental status before and after the procedure.

== Drawbacks ==
There are many drawbacks of invasive procedures, which include increased patient discomfort, increased wound care, and longer healing periods. Use of invasive diagnostic techniques in the case of pregnant mothers increases the chances of abortion and mental stress.
