= Pappalysin-1 =

Class of enzymes

PAPPA

Identifiers
- Aliases: PAPPA, ASBABP2, DIPLA1, IGFBP-4ase, PAPA, PAPP-A, PAPPA1, pappalysin 1
- External IDs: OMIM: 176385; MGI: 97479; GeneCards: PAPPA
Enzyme activity
| EC # | BRENDA | ExPASy | KEGG | MetaCyc |
|---|---|---|---|---|
| 3.4.24.79 | ↗ | ↗ | ↗ | ↗ |

Gene location (Human)
| Chr. | Chromosome 9 (human) |
| Band | 9q33.1 | Start | 116,153,791 bp |
| Band | 9q33.1 | End | 116,402,321 bp |

Gene location (Mouse)
| Chr. | Chromosome 4 (mouse) |
| Band | 4 C1|4 34.14 cM | Start | 65,042,411 bp |
| Band | 4 C1|4 34.14 cM | End | 65,275,746 bp |
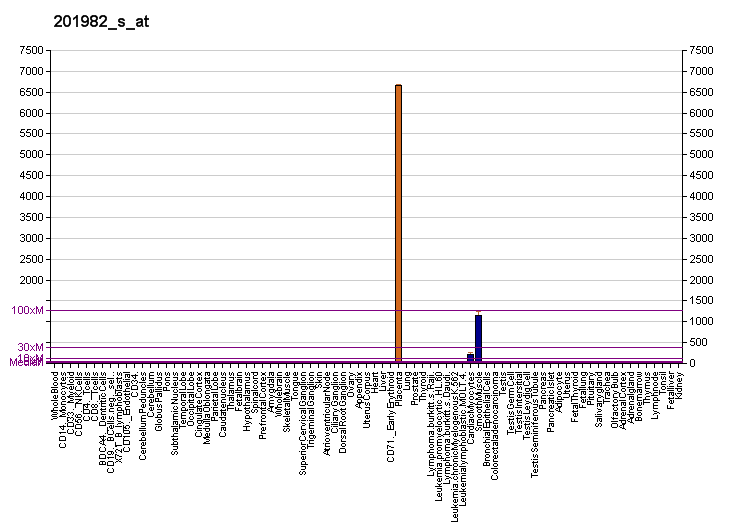

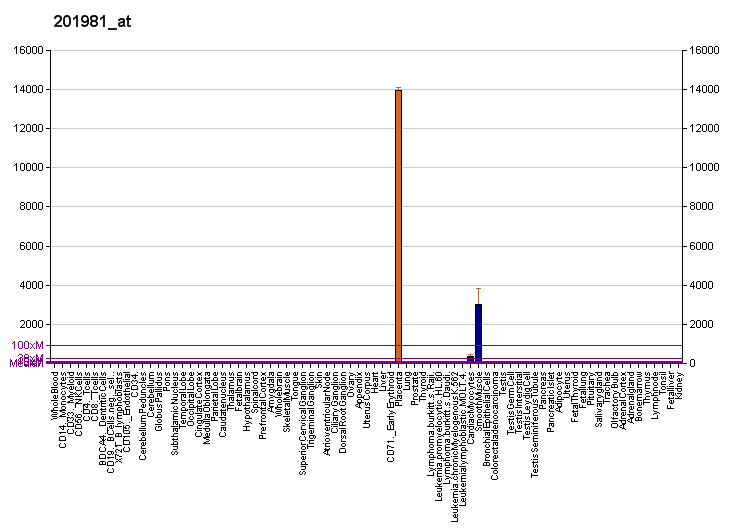
RNA expression pattern
| Bgee | Human / Mouse (ortholog); Top expressed in: decidua; buccal mucosa cell; stromal cell of endometrium; tendon of biceps brachii; cartilage tissue; pericardium; renal medulla; parietal pleura; tibia; mucosa of paranasal sinus / Top expressed in: stroma of bone marrow; calvaria; epithelium of lens; lumbar spinal ganglion; substantia nigra; efferent ductule; facial motor nucleus; Rostral migratory stream; Paneth cell; external carotid artery; More reference expression data |
| BioGPS | More reference expression data |
Gene ontology
| Molecular function | zinc ion binding; peptidase activity; endopeptidase activity; hydrolase activity; metallopeptidase activity; metal ion binding; metalloendopeptidase activity |
| Cellular component | extracellular region; extracellular space |
| Biological process | proteolysis; response to follicle-stimulating hormone; female pregnancy; response to glucocorticoid |
Sources:Amigo / QuickGO
Orthologs
| Databases | NCBI: entry; OMA: entry |
| Species | Human | Mouse |
| Entrez | 5069 | 18491 |
| Ensembl | ENSG00000182752 | ENSMUSG00000028370 |
| UniProt | Q13219 | Q8R4K8 |
| RefSeq (mRNA) | NM_002581 | NM_021362 |
| RefSeq (protein) | NP_002572 | NP_067337 |
| Location (UCSC) | Chr 9: 116.15 – 116.4 Mb | Chr 4: 65.04 – 65.28 Mb |
| PubMed search |
- Wikidata
| View/Edit Human | View/Edit Mouse |

Pappalysin-1, also known as pregnancy-associated plasma protein A, and insulin-like growth factor binding protein-4 protease is a protein encoded by the PAPPA gene in humans. PAPPA is a secreted protease whose main substrate is insulin-like growth factor binding proteins. Pappalysin-1 is also used in screening tests for Down syndrome.

== Function ==
PAPPA encodes a secreted metalloproteinase which cleaves insulin-like growth factor–binding proteins (IGFBPs). PAPPA's proteolytic function is activated upon collagen binding. It is thought to be involved in local proliferative processes such as wound healing and bone remodeling. Low plasma level of this protein has been suggested as a biochemical marker for pregnancies with aneuploid fetuses (fetuses with an abnormal number of chromosomes). For example, low PAPPA may be commonly seen in prenatal screening for Down syndrome. Low levels may alternatively predict issues with the placenta, resulting in adverse complications such as intrauterine growth restriction, preeclampsia, placental abruption, premature birth, or fetal death.

This enzyme catalyses the following chemical reaction:

Cleavage of the Met135-Lys bond in insulin-like growth factor binding protein (IGFBP)-4, and the Ser143-Lys bond in IGFBP-5 This enzyme belongs to the peptidase family M43.

== Interactions ==
Pappalysin-1 has been shown to interact with major basic protein.

Studies conducted at the Royal London Hospital in the United Kingdom, have shown that a marker of Down syndrome may be expressed during the first trimester and second trimester of a pregnancy term. Concentrations of the Pregnancy-Associated Plasma Protein (PAPPA) gene as well as other markers can help screen for Down syndrome in the beginning stages of a woman's gestational period.
