= Cell-free fetal DNA =

Fetal DNA in the maternal bloodstream

Cell-free fetal DNA (cffDNA) is fetal DNA that circulates freely in the maternal blood. Maternal blood is sampled by venipuncture. Analysis of cffDNA is a method of non-invasive prenatal diagnosis frequently ordered for pregnant women of advanced age. Two hours after delivery, cffDNA is no longer detectable in maternal blood.

== Background ==
Cell-free fetal DNA sheds into the maternal blood circulation.

cffDNA originates from placental trophoblasts. Fetal DNA is fragmented when placental microparticles are shed into the maternal blood circulation.

cffDNA fragments are approximately 200 base pairs (bp) in length. They are significantly smaller than maternal DNA fragments. The difference in size allows cffDNA to be distinguished from maternal DNA fragments.

Approximately 11 to 13.4 percent of the cell-free DNA in maternal blood is of fetal origin. The amount varies widely from one pregnant woman to another. cffDNA is present after five to seven weeks gestation. The amount of cffDNA increases as the pregnancy progresses. The quantity of cffDNA in maternal blood diminishes rapidly after childbirth. Two hours after delivery, cffDNA is no longer detectable in maternal blood.

Analysis of cffDNA may provide earlier diagnosis of fetal conditions than current techniques. As cffDNA is found in maternal blood, sampling carries no associated risk of spontaneous abortion. cffDNA analysis has the same ethical and practical issues as other techniques such as amniocentesis and chorionic villus sampling.

Some disadvantages of sampling cffDNA include a low concentration of cffDNA in maternal blood; variation in the quantity of cffDNA between individuals; a high concentration of maternal cell free DNA compared to the cffDNA in maternal blood.

New evidence shows that cffDNA test failure rate is higher, fetal fraction (proportion of fetal versus maternal DNA in the maternal blood sample) is lower and PPV for trisomies 18, 13 and SCA is decreased in IVF pregnancies compared to those conceived spontaneously.

== Laboratory methods ==
A number of laboratory methods have been developed for cell-free fetal DNA screening for genetic defects have been developed. The main ones are (1) massively parallel shotgun sequencing (MPSS), (2) targeted massive parallel sequencing (t-MPS) and (3) single nucleotide polymorphism (SNP) based approach.

A maternal peripheral blood sample is taken by venesection at about ten weeks gestation.

=== Separation of cffDNA ===
Blood plasma is separated from the maternal blood sample using a laboratory centrifuge. The cffDNA is then isolated and purified. A standardized protocol for doing this was written through an evaluation of the scientific literature. The highest yield in cffDNA extraction was obtained with the "QIAamp DSP Virus Kit".

Addition of formaldehyde to maternal blood samples increases the yield of cffDNA. Formaldehyde stabilizes intact cells, and therefore inhibits the further release of maternal DNA. With the addition of formaldehyde, the percentage of cffDNA recovered from a maternal blood sample varies between 0.32 percent and 40 percent with a mean of 7.7 percent. Without the addition of formaldehyde, the mean percentage of cffDNA recovered has been measured at 20.2 percent. However, other figures vary between 5 and 96 percent.

Recovery of cffDNA may be related to the length of the DNA fragments. Another way to increase the fetal DNA is based on physical length of DNA fragments. Smaller fragments can represent up to seventy percent of the total cell free DNA in the maternal blood sample.

=== Analysis of cffDNA ===
In real-time PCR, fluorescent probes are used to monitor the accumulation of amplicons. The reporter fluorescent signal is proportional to the number of amplicons generated. The most appropriate real time PCR protocol is designed according to the particular mutation or genotype to be detected. Point mutations are analysed with qualitative real time PCR with the use of allele specific probes. Insertions and deletions are analyzed by dosage measurements using quantitative real time PCR.

cffDNA may be detected by finding paternally inherited DNA sequences via polymerase chain reaction (PCR).

==== Quantitative real-time PCR ====
Sex-determining region Y gene (SRY) and Y chromosome short tandem repeat "DYS14" in cffDNA from 511 pregnancies were analyzed using quantitative real-time PCR (RT-qPCR). In 401 of 403 pregnancies where maternal blood was drawn at seven weeks gestation or more, both segments of DNA were found.

==== Nested PCR ====
The use of nested polymerase chain reaction (nested PCR) was evaluated to determine sex by detecting a Y chromosome specific signal in the cffDNA from maternal plasma. Nested PCR detected 53 of 55 male fetuses. The cffDNA from the plasma of 3 of 25 women with female fetuses contained the Y chromosome-specific signal. The sensitivity of nested PCR in this experiment was 96 percent. The specificity was 88 percent.

==== Digital PCR ====
Microfluidic devices allow the quantification of cffDNA segments in maternal plasma with accuracy beyond that of real-time PCR. Point mutations, loss of heterozygosity and aneuploidy can be detected in a single PCR step. Digital PCR can differentiate between maternal blood plasma and fetal DNA in a multiplex fashion.

==== Shotgun sequencing ====
High throughput shotgun sequencing using tools such as Solexa or Illumina yields approximately 5 million sequence tags per sample of maternal serum. Aneuploid pregnancies such as trisomy were identified when testing at the fourteenth week of gestation. Fetal whole of genome mapping by parental haplotype analysis was completed using sequencing of cffDNA from maternal serum. Pregnant females were studied using a 2-plex massively parallel maternal plasma DNA sequencing and trisomy was diagnosed with z-score greater than 3. The sequencing gave sensitivity of 100 percent, specificity of 97.9 percent, a positive predictive value of 96.6 percent and a negative predictive value of 100 percent.

==== Mass spectrometry ====
Matrix-assisted laser desorption/ionization-time-of-flight mass spectrometry (MALDI-TOF MS) combined with single-base extension after PCR allows cffDNA detection with single base specificity and single DNA molecule sensitivity. DNA is amplified by PCR. Then, linear amplification with base extension reaction (with a third primer) is designed to anneal to the region upstream from the mutation site. One or two bases are added to the extension primer to produce two extension products from wild-type DNA and mutant DNA. Single base specificity provides advantages over hybridization-based techniques using TaqMan hydrolysis probes. When assessing the technique, no false positives or negatives were found when looking for cffDNA to determine fetal sex in sixteen maternal plasma samples. The sex of ninety-one male foetuses were correctly detected using MALDI-TOF mass spectrometry. The technique had accuracy, sensitivity and specificity of over 99 percent.

==== Epigenetic modifications ====
Differences in gene activation between maternal and fetal DNA can be exploited. Epigenetic modifications (heritable modifications that change gene function without changing DNA sequence) can be used to detect cffDNA. The hypermethylated RASSF1A promoter is a universal fetal marker used to confirm the presence of cffDNA. A technique was described where cffDNA was extracted from maternal plasma and then digested with methylation-sensitive and insensitive restriction enzymes. Then, real-time PCR analysis of RASSF1A, SRY, and DYS14 was done. The procedure detected 79 out of 90 (88 percent) maternal blood samples where hypermethylated RASSF1A was present.

==== mRNA ====
mRNA transcripts from genes expressed in the placenta are detectable in maternal plasma. In this procedure, plasma is centrifuged so an aqueous layer appears. This layer is transferred and from it RNA is extracted. RT-PCR is used to detect a selected expression of RNA. For example, Human placental lactogen (hPL) and beta-hCG mRNA are stable in maternal plasma and can be detected. (Ng et al. 2002). This can help to confirm the presence of cffDNA in maternal plasma.

== Applications ==
=== Prenatal sex discernment ===
The analysis of cffDNA from a sample of maternal plasma allows for prenatal sex discernment. Applications of prenatal sex discernment include:

- Disease testing: Whether the sex of the fetus is male or female allows the determination of the risk of a particular X-linked recessive genetic disorder in a particular pregnancy, especially where the mother is a genetic carrier of the disorder.
- Preparation, for any sex-dependent aspects of parenting.
- Sex selection, which after preimplantation genetic diagnosis may be performed by selecting only embryos of the preferred sex, or, after post-implantation methods by performing sex-selective abortion depending on the test result and personal preference.

In comparison to obstetric ultrasonography which is unreliable for sex determination in the first trimester and amniocentesis which carries a small risk of miscarriage, sampling of maternal plasma for analysis of cffDNA is without risk. The main targets in the cffDNA analysis are the gene responsible for the sex-determining region Y protein (SRY) on the Y chromosome and the DYS14 sequence.

=== Congenital adrenal hyperplasia ===
In congenital adrenal hyperplasia, the adrenal cortex lacks appropriate corticosteroid synthesis, leading to excess adrenal androgens and affects female fetuses. There is an external masculinization of the genitalia in the female fetuses. Mothers of at risk fetuses are given dexamethasone at 6 weeks gestation to suppress pituitary gland release of androgens.

If analysis of cffDNA obtained from a sample of maternal plasma lacks genetic markers found only on the Y chromosome, it is suggestive of a female fetus. However, it might also indicate a failure of the analysis itself (a false negative result). Paternal genetic polymorphisms and sex-independent markers may be used to detect cffDNA. A high degree of heterozygosity of these markers must be present for this application.

=== Paternity testing ===
Prenatal DNA paternity testing is commercially available. The test can be performed at nine weeks gestation.

=== Single gene disorders ===
Autosomal dominant and recessive single gene disorders which have been diagnosed prenatally by analysing paternally inherited DNA include cystic fibrosis, beta thalassemia, sickle cell anemia, spinal muscular atrophy, and myotonic dystrophy. Prenatal diagnosis of single gene disorders which are due to an autosomal recessive mutation, a maternally inherited autosomal dominant mutation or large sequence mutations that include duplication, expansion or insertion of DNA sequences is more difficult.

In cffDNA, fragments of 200 – 300 bp length involved in single gene disorders are more difficult to detect.

For example, the autosomal dominant condition, achondroplasia is caused by the FGFR3 gene point mutation. In two pregnancies with a fetus with achondroplasia was found a paternally inherited G1138A mutation from cffDNA from a maternal plasma sample in one and a G1138A de novo mutation from the other.

In studies of the genetics of Huntington's chorea using qRT-PCR of cffDNA from maternal plasma samples, CAG repeats have been detected at normal levels (17, 20 and 24).

cffDNA may also be used to diagnose single gene disorders. Developments in laboratory processes using cffDNA may allow prenatal diagnosis of aneuploidies such as trisomy 21 (Down syndrome) in the fetus.

=== Hemolytic disease of the fetus and newborn ===
Incompatibility of fetal and maternal RhD antigens is the main cause of Hemolytic disease of the newborn. Approximately 15 percent of Caucasian women, 3 to 5 percent of black Africa women and less than 3 percent of Asian women are RhD negative.

Accurate prenatal diagnosis is important because the disease can be fatal to the newborn and because treatment including intramuscular immunoglobulin (Anti-D) or intravenous immunoglobulin can be administered to mothers at risk.

PCR to detect RHD (gene) gene exons 5 and 7 from cffDNA obtained from maternal plasma between 9 and 13 weeks gestation gives a high degree of specificity, sensitivity and diagnostic accuracy (>90 percent) when compared to RhD determination from newborn cord blood serum. Similar results were obtained targeting exons 7 and 10. Droplet digital PCR in fetal RhD determination was comparable to a routine real-time PCR technique.

Routine determination of fetal RhD status from cffDNA in maternal serum allows early management of at risk pregnancies while decreasing unnecessary use of Anti-D by over 25 percent.

=== Aneuploidy ===
Sex chromosomes

Analysis of maternal serum cffDNA by high-throughput sequencing can detect common fetal sex chromosome aneuploidies such as Turner's syndrome, Klinefelter's syndrome and triple X syndrome but the procedure's positive predictive value is low.

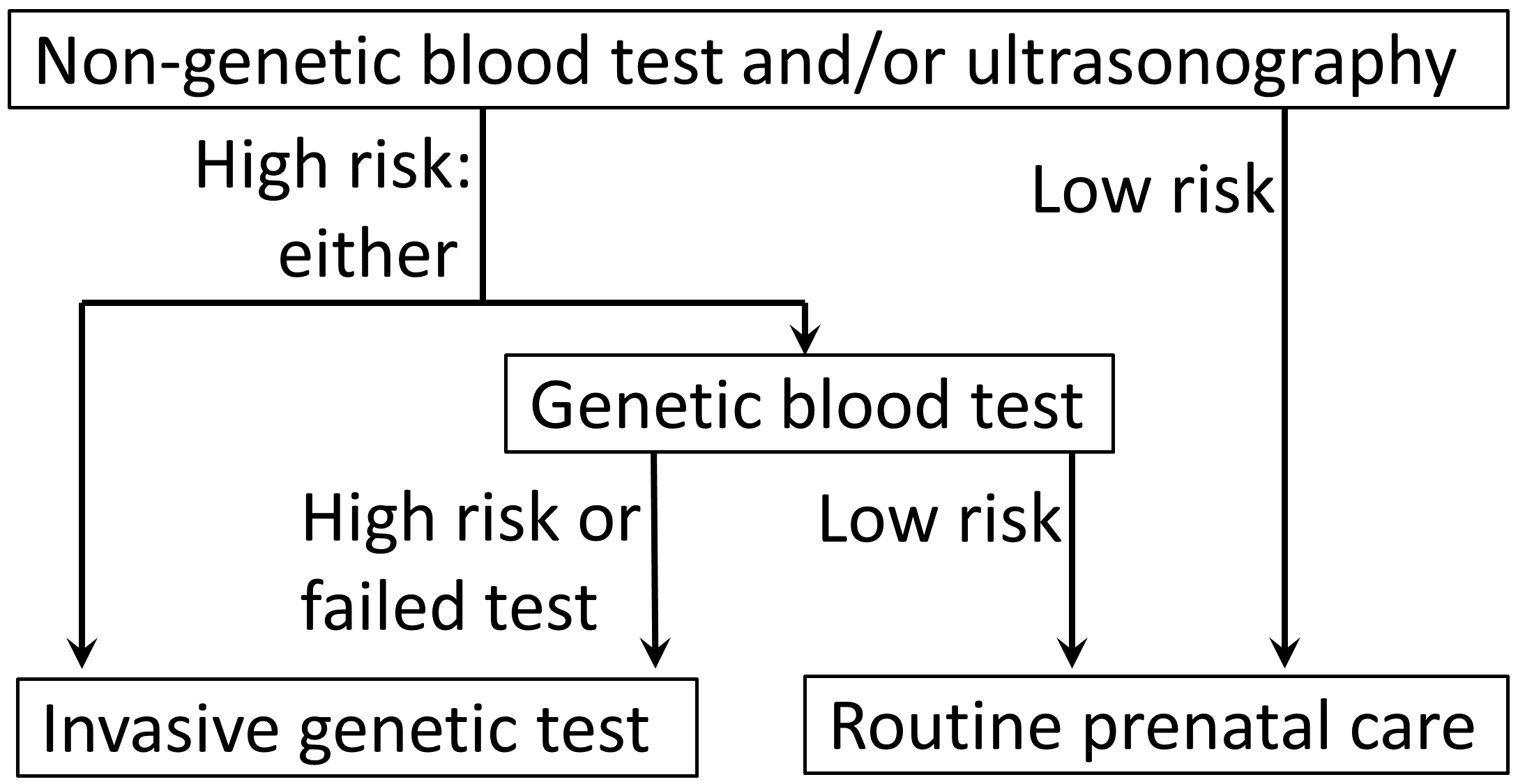
An example of an algorithm for determining the indication for prenatal genetic testing for trisomy 21 (Down syndrome), wherein the genetic blood test (in center) is performed by detecting cffDNA in a blood sample from the mother.

Trisomy 21

Fetal trisomy of chromosome 21 is the cause of Down syndrome. This trisomy can be detected by analysis of cffDNA from maternal blood by massively parallel shotgun sequencing (MPSS). Another technique is digital analysis of selected regions (DANSR). Such tests show a sensitivity of about 99% and a specificity of more than 99.9%. Therefore, they cannot be regarded as diagnostic procedures but may be used to confirm a positive maternal screening test such as a first trimester screening or ultrasound markers of the condition.

Trisomy 13 and 18

Analysis of cffDNA from maternal plasma with MPSS looking for trisomy 13 or 18 is possible

Factors limiting sensitivity and specificity include the levels of cffDNA in the maternal plasma; maternal chromosomes may have mosaicism.

A number of fetal nucleic acid molecules derived from aneuploid chromosomes can be detected including SERPINEB2 mRNA, clad B, hypomethylated SERPINB5 from chromosome 18, placenta-specific 4 (PLAC4), hypermethylated holocarboxylase synthetase (HLCS) and c21orf105 mRNA from chromosome 12. With complete trisomy, the mRNA alleles in maternal plasma isn't the normal 1:1 ratio, but is in fact 2:1. Allelic ratios determined by epigenetic markers can also be used to detect the complete trisomies. Massive parallel sequencing and digital PCR for fetal aneuploidy detection can be used without restriction to fetal-specific nucleic acid molecules. (MPSS) is estimated to have a sensitivity of between 96 and 100%, and a specificity between 94 and 100% for detecting Down syndrome. It can be performed at 10 weeks of gestational age. One study in the United States estimated a false positive rate of 0.3% and a positive predictive value of 80% when using cffDNA to detect Down syndrome.

=== Preeclampsia ===
Preeclampsia is a complex condition of pregnancy involving hypertension and proteinuria usually after 20 weeks gestation. It is associated with poor cytotrophoblastic invasion of the myometrium. Onset of the condition between 20 and 34 weeks gestation, is considered "early". Maternal plasma samples in pregnancies complicated by preeclampsia have significantly higher levels of cffDNA that those in normal pregnancies. This holds true for early onset preeclampsia.

== History ==
In 1997, Hong Kong molecular biologist Dennis Lo and his team first employed the Y-PCR assay to identify fetal Y chromosome sequences (because Y-specific sequences are genetic sequences of the fetus not in the maternal genome) in maternal plasma samples. For this groundbreaking work, Lo was honored with the 2022 Lasker DeBakey Clinical Medical Research Award.

== Future perspectives ==
New generation sequencing may be used to yield a whole genome sequence from cffDNA. This raises ethical questions. However, the utility of the procedure may increase as clear associations between specific genetic variants and disease states are discovered.

== See also ==
- Microchimerism
- Quad test
- Triple test
