= Aneuploidy =

Presence of an abnormal number of chromosomes in a cell

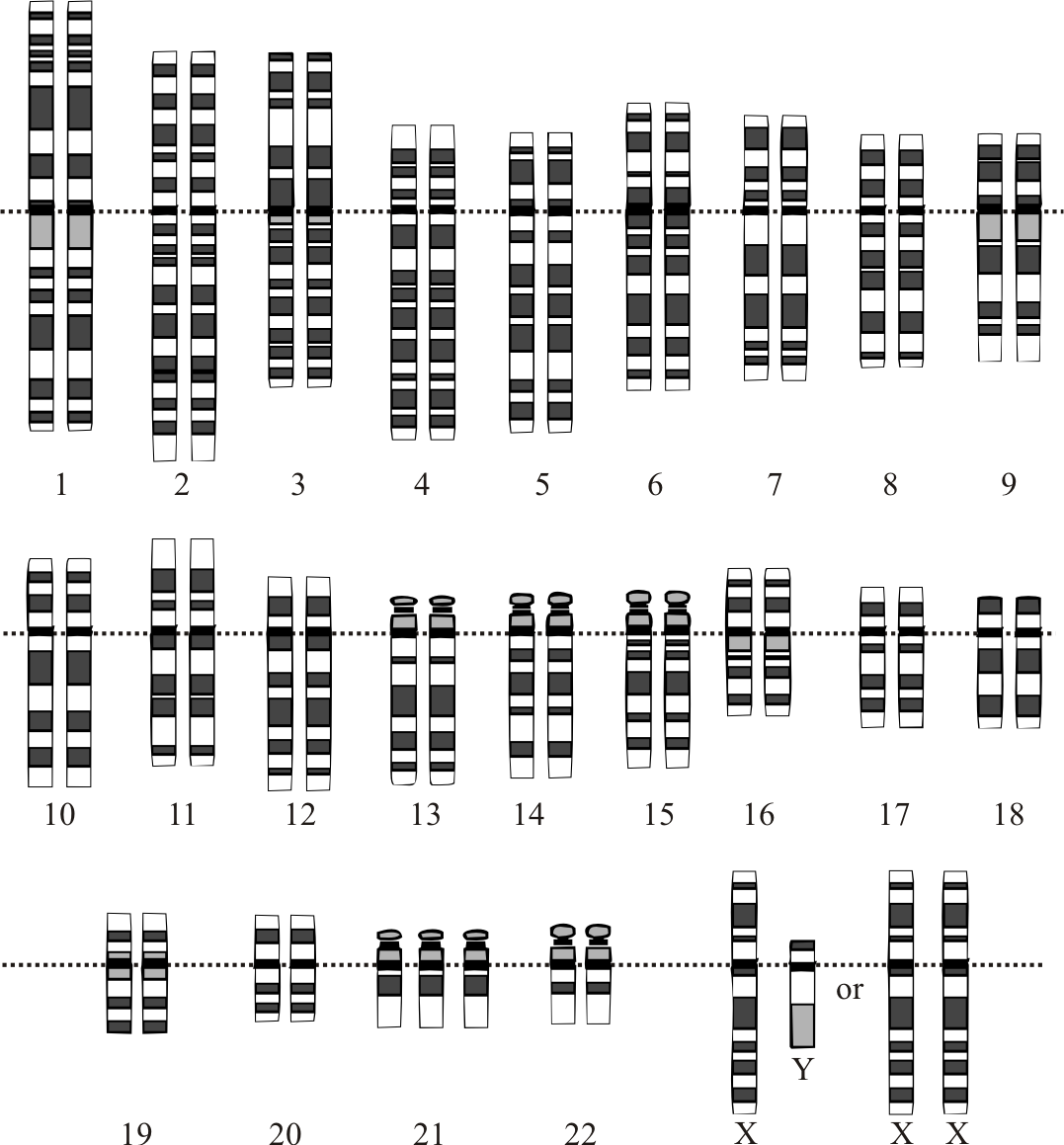
- Chromosomes in Down syndrome, one of the most common human conditions due to aneuploidy. There are three chromosomes 21 (in the last row).
- Specialty: Medical genetics

Aneuploidy is the presence of an abnormal number of chromosomes in a cell, for example a human somatic cell having 45 or 47 chromosomes instead of the usual 46. It does not include a difference of one or more complete sets of chromosomes. A cell with any number of complete chromosome sets is called a euploid cell.

An extra or missing chromosome is a common cause of some genetic disorders. Some cancer cells also have abnormal numbers of chromosomes. About 68% of human solid tumors are aneuploid. Aneuploidy originates during cell division when the chromosomes do not separate properly between the two cells (nondisjunction). Most cases of aneuploidy in the autosomes result in miscarriage, and the most common extra autosomal chromosomes among live births are 21, 18 and 13. Chromosome abnormalities are detected in 1 of 160 live human births. Autosomal aneuploidy is more dangerous than sex chromosome aneuploidy, as autosomal aneuploidy is almost always lethal to embryos that cease developing because of it.

As women age, oocytes develop defects in mitochondrial structure and function and have meiotic spindle dysregulation: these increase rates of aneuploidy and miscarriage. The rate of aneuploidy in women using IVF increases from 30% at age 31 to 36% at age 36. After this it increases by 7% per year to reach 89% at age 44.

== Chromosomes ==
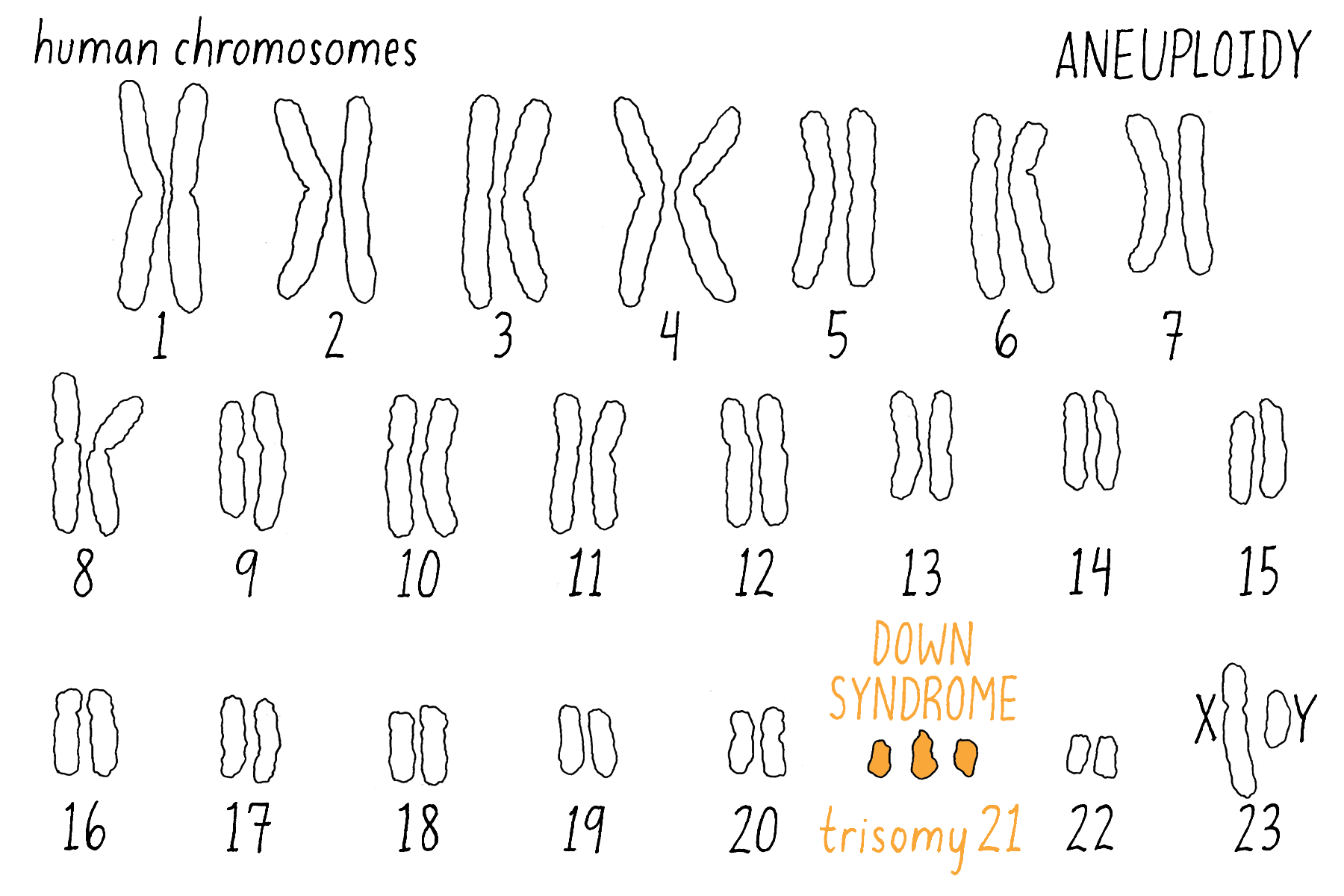
A condition where a cell contains an abnormal number of chromosomes, either too many or too few. Down syndrome in humans arises from three copies (trisomy) of chromosome 21.

Most cells in the human body have 23 pairs of chromosomes, or a total of 46 chromosomes. (The sperm and egg, or gametes, each have 23 unpaired chromosomes, and red blood cells in bone marrow have a nucleus at first but those red blood cells that are active in blood lose their nucleus and thus they end up having no nucleus and therefore no chromosomes.)

One copy of each pair is inherited from the mother and the other copy is inherited from the father. The first 22 pairs of chromosomes (called autosomes) are numbered from 1 to 22, from largest to smallest. The 23rd pair of chromosomes are the sex chromosomes. Typical females have two X chromosomes, while typical males have one X chromosome and one Y chromosome. The characteristics of the chromosomes in a cell as they are seen under a light microscope are called the karyotype.

During meiosis, when germ cells divide to create sperm and egg (gametes), each half should have the same number of chromosomes. But sometimes, the whole pair of chromosomes will end up in one gamete, and the other gamete will not get that chromosome at all.

Most embryos cannot survive with a missing or extra autosome (numbered chromosome) and are miscarried. The most frequent aneuploidy in humans is trisomy 16 and fetuses affected with the full version of this chromosome abnormality do not survive to term, although it is possible for surviving individuals to have the mosaic form, where trisomy 16 exists in some cells but not all. The most common aneuploidy that infants can survive with is trisomy 21, which is found in Down syndrome, affecting 1 in 800 births. Trisomy 18 (Edwards syndrome) affects 1 in 6,000 births, and trisomy 13 (Patau syndrome) affects 1 in 10,000 births. 10% of infants with trisomy 18 or 13 reach 1 year of age.

Changes in chromosome number may not necessarily be present in all cells in an individual. When aneuploidy is detected in a fraction of cells in an individual, it is called chromosomal mosaicism. In general, individuals who are mosaic for a chromosomal aneuploidy tend to have a less severe form of the syndrome compared to those with full trisomy. For many of the autosomal trisomies, only mosaic cases survive to term. However, mitotic aneuploidy may be more common than previously recognized in somatic tissues, and aneuploidy is a characteristic of many types of tumorigenesis.

== Mechanisms ==
Aneuploidy arises from errors in chromosome segregation, which can go wrong in several ways.

Nondisjunction usually occurs as the result of a weakened mitotic checkpoint, as these checkpoints tend to arrest or delay cell division until all components of the cell are ready to enter the next phase. For example, if a checkpoint is weakened, the cell may fail to 'notice' that a chromosome pair is not lined with the spindle apparatus. In such a case, most chromosomes would separate normally (with one chromatid ending up in each cell), while others could fail to separate at all. This would generate a daughter cell lacking a copy and a daughter cell with an extra copy.

Completely inactive mitotic checkpoints may cause nondisjunction at multiple chromosomes, possibly all. Such a scenario could result in each daughter cell possessing a disjoint set of genetic material.

Merotelic attachment occurs when one kinetochore is attached to both mitotic spindle poles. One daughter cell would have a normal complement of chromosomes; the second would lack one. A third daughter cell may end up with the 'missing' chromosome.

Multipolar spindles: more than two spindle poles form. Such a mitotic division would result in one daughter cell for each spindle pole; each cell may possess an unpredictable complement of chromosomes.

Monopolar spindle: only a single spindle pole forms. This produces a single daughter cell with its copy number doubled.

A tetraploid intermediate may be produced as the end-result of the monopolar spindle mechanism. In such a case, the cell has double the copy number of a normal cell, and produces double the number of spindle poles as well. This results in four daughter cells with an unpredictable complement of chromosomes, but in the normal copy number.

== Somatic mosaicism in the nervous system ==
Mosaicism for aneuploid chromosome content may be part of the constitutional make-up of the mammalian brain. In the normal human brain, brain samples from six individuals ranging from 2–86 years of age had mosaicism for chromosome 21 aneuploidy (average of 4% of neurons analyzed). This low-level aneuploidy appears to arise from chromosomal segregation defects during cell division in neuronal precursor cells, and neurons containing such aneuploid chromosome content reportedly integrate into normal circuits. However, recent research using single-cell sequencing has challenged these findings, and has suggested that aneuploidy in the brain is actually very rare.

== Somatic mosaicism in cancer ==
Aneuploidy is consistently observed in virtually all cancers. The German biologist Theodor Boveri was first to propose a causative role for aneuploidy in cancer. However, the theory of Boveri was forgotten until the molecular biologist Peter Duesberg reappraised it. Understanding through what mechanisms it can affect tumor evolution is an important topic of current cancer research.

Somatic mosaicism occurs in virtually all cancer cells, including trisomy 12 in chronic lymphocytic leukemia (CLL) and trisomy 8 in acute myeloid leukemia (AML). However, these forms of mosaic aneuploidy occur through mechanisms distinct from those typically associated with genetic syndromes involving complete or mosaic aneuploidy, such as chromosomal instability (due to mitotic segregation defects in cancer cells). Therefore, the molecular processes that lead to aneuploidy are targets for the development of cancer drugs. Both resveratrol and aspirin have been found in vivo (in mice) to selectively destroy tetraploid cells that may be precursors of aneuploid cells, and activate AMPK, which may be involved in the process.

Alteration of normal mitotic checkpoints are also important tumorigenic events, and these may directly lead to aneuploidy. Loss of tumor suppressor p53 gene often results in genomic instability, which could lead to the aneuploidy genotype.

In addition, genetic syndromes in which an individual is predisposed to breakage of chromosomes (chromosome instability syndromes) are frequently associated with increased risk for various types of cancer, thus highlighting the role of somatic aneuploidy in carcinogenesis.

The ability to evade the immune system appears to be enhanced in tumoral cells with strong aneuploidy. This has therefore suggested that the presence of an abnormal number of chromosomes might be an effective predictive biomarker for response to precise immunotherapy. For example, in melanoma patients, high somatic copy number alterations are associated with less effective response to immune checkpoint blockade anti–CTLA4 (cytotoxic T lymphocyte–associated protein 4) therapy.

A research work published in 2008 focuses on the mechanisms involved in aneuploidy formation, specifically on the epigenetic origin of aneuploid cells. Epigenetic inheritance is defined as cellular information other than the DNA sequence itself, that is still heritable during cell division. DNA methylation and histone modifications comprise two of the main epigenetic modifications important for many physiological and pathological conditions, including cancer. Aberrant DNA methylation is the most common molecular lesion in cancer-cells, even more frequent than gene mutations. Tumor suppressor gene silencing by CpG island promoter hypermethylation is supposed to be the most frequent epigenetic modification in cancer cells. Epigenetic characteristics of cells may be modified by several factors including environmental exposure, deficiencies of certain nutrients, radiation, etc. Some of the alterations have been correlated with the formation of aneuploid cells in vivo. In this study it is suggested on a growing basis of evidence, that not only genetics but also epigenetics, contribute to aneuploid cell formation.

== Partial aneuploidy ==
The terms "partial monosomy" and "partial trisomy" are used to describe an imbalance of genetic material caused by loss or gain of part of a chromosome. In particular, these terms would be used in the situation of an unbalanced translocation, where an individual carries a derivative chromosome formed through the breakage and fusion of two different chromosomes. In this situation, the individual would have three copies of part of one chromosome (two normal copies and the portion that exists on the derivative chromosome) and only one copy of part of the other chromosome involved in the derivative chromosome. Robertsonian translocations, for example, account for a very small minority of Down syndrome cases (<5%). The formation of one isochromosome results in partial trisomy of the genes present in the isochromosome and partial monosomy of the genes in the lost arm.

== Aneugens ==
Agents capable of causing aneuploidy are called aneugens. Many mutagenic carcinogens are aneugens. X-rays, for example, may cause aneuploidy by fragmenting the chromosome; it may also target the spindle apparatus. Other chemicals such as colchicine can also produce aneuploidy by affecting microtubule polymerization.

Exposure of males to lifestyle, environmental and/or occupational hazards may increase the risk of spermatozoa aneuploidy. Tobacco smoke contains chemicals that cause DNA damage. Smoking can also induce aneuploidy. For instance, smoking increases chromosome 13 disomy in spermatozoa by 3-fold, and YY disomy by 2-fold.

Occupational exposure to benzene is associated with a 2.8-fold increase of XX disomy and a 2.6-fold increase of YY disomy in spermatozoa.

Pesticides are released to the environment in sufficiently large quantities that most individuals have some degree of exposure. The insecticides fenvalerate and carbaryl have been reported to increase spermatozoa aneuploidy. Occupational exposure of pesticide factory workers to fenvalerate is associated with increased spermatozoa DNA damage. Exposure to fenvalerate raised sex chromosome disomy 1.9-fold and disomy of chromosome 18 by 2.6-fold. Exposure of male workers to carbaryl increased DNA fragmentation in spermatozoa, and also increased sex chromosome disomy by 1.7-fold and chromosome 18 disomy by 2.2-fold.

Humans are exposed to perfluorinated compounds (PFCs) in many commercial products. Men contaminated with PFCs in whole blood or seminal plasma have spermatozoa with increased levels of DNA fragmentation and chromosomal aneuploidies.

== Diagnosis ==
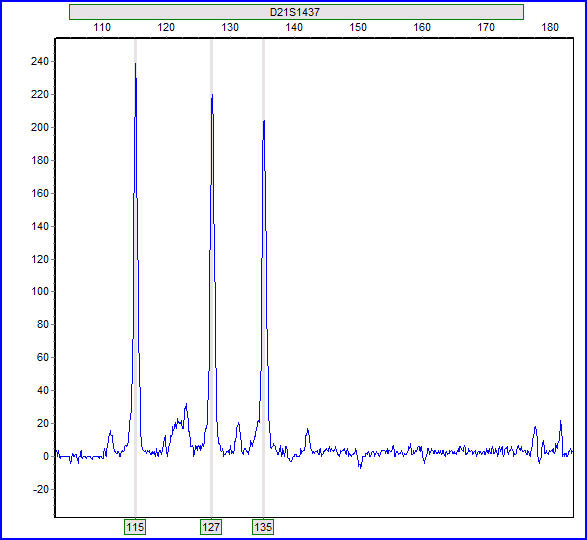
Example of Trisomy 21 detected via quantitative PCR short tandem repeat assay

Germline aneuploidy is typically detected through karyotyping, a process in which a sample of cells is fixed and stained to create the typical light and dark chromosomal banding pattern and a picture of the chromosomes is analyzed. Other techniques include fluorescence in situ hybridization (FISH), quantitative PCR of short tandem repeats, quantitative fluorescence PCR (QF-PCR), quantitative PCR dosage analysis, Quantitative Mass Spectrometry of Single Nucleotide Polymorphisms, and comparative genomic hybridization (CGH).

These tests can also be performed prenatally to detect aneuploidy in a pregnancy, through either amniocentesis or chorionic villus sampling. Pregnant women of 35 years or older are offered prenatal testing because the chance of chromosomal aneuploidy increases as the mother's age increases.

Recent advances have allowed for less invasive testing methods based on the presence of fetal genetic material in maternal blood. See Triple test and Cell-free fetal DNA.

=== Types ===
key
color	significance
	lethal
	typical male phenotype
	Klinefelter syndrome (non-typical male)
	polysomy X and/or Y (non-typical male)
	typical female phenotype
	Turner's syndrome (non-typical female)
	polysomy X (non-typical female)

Non-autosomal
	0	X	XX	XXX	XXXX	XXXXX
0	0	X	XX	XXX	XXXX	XXXXX
Y	Y	XY	XXY	XXXY	XXXXY	XXXXXY
YY	YY	XYY	XXYY	XXXYY	XXXXYY	XXXXXYY
YYY	YYY	XYYY	XXYYY	XXXYYY	XXXXYYY	XXXXXYYY
YYYY	YYYY	XYYYY	XXYYYY	XXXYYYY	XXXXYYYY	XXXXXYYYY
YYYYY	YYYYY	XYYYYY	XXYYYYY	XXXYYYYY	XXXXYYYYY	XXXXXYYYYY

key
color	significance
	case where complete non-mosaic trisomy can never survive to term
	case where complete non-mosaic trisomy can rarely (barring other complications) survive to term
	case where complete non-mosaic trisomy can frequently (barring other complications) survive to term

Schematic karyogram of a human, showing the normal diploid karyotype. It shows annotated bands and sub-bands as used for the nomenclature of chromosome abnormalities. It shows 22 homologous chromosomes, both the female (XX) and male (XY) versions of the sex chromosome (bottom right), as well as the mitochondrial genome (to scale at bottom left).

Autosomal
#	monosomy	trisomy
1	1p36 deletion syndrome 1q21.1 deletion syndrome	Trisomy 1
2	2q37 deletion syndrome	Trisomy 2
3		Trisomy 3
4	Wolf–Hirschhorn syndrome	Trisomy 4
5	Cri du chat 5q deletion syndrome	Trisomy 5
6		Trisomy 6
7	Williams syndrome	Trisomy 7
8	Monosomy 8p Monosomy 8q	Trisomy 8
9	Alfi's syndrome Kleefstra syndrome	Trisomy 9
10	Monosomy 10p Monosomy 10q	Trisomy 10
11	Jacobsen syndrome	Trisomy 11
12		Trisomy 12
13		Patau syndrome
14		Trisomy 14
15	Angelman syndrome Prader–Willi syndrome	Trisomy 15
16		Trisomy 16
17	Miller–Dieker syndrome Smith–Magenis syndrome	Trisomy 17
18	Distal 18q- Proximal 18q-	Edwards syndrome
19		Trisomy 19
20		Trisomy 20
21		Down syndrome
22	DiGeorge syndrome Phelan–McDermid syndrome 22q11.2 distal deletion syndrome	Cat eye syndrome Trisomy 22

== Terminology ==
In the strict sense, a chromosome complement having a number of chromosomes other than 46 (in humans) is considered heteroploid while an exact multiple of the haploid chromosome complement is considered euploid.

Number of chromosomes	Name	Description
1	Monosomy	Monosomy refers to lack of one chromosome of the normal complement. Partial monosomy can occur in unbalanced translocations or deletions, in which only a portion of the chromosome is present in a single copy (see deletion (genetics)). Monosomy of the sex chromosomes (45,X) causes Turner syndrome.
2	Disomy	Disomy is the presence of two copies of a chromosome. For organisms such as humans that have two copies of each chromosome (those that are diploid), it is the normal condition. For organisms that normally have three or more copies of each chromosome (those that are triploid or above), disomy is an aneuploid chromosome complement. In uniparental disomy, both copies of a chromosome come from the same parent (with no contribution from the other parent).
3	Trisomy	Trisomy refers to the presence of three copies, instead of the normal two, of a particular chromosome. The presence of an extra chromosome 21, which is found in Down syndrome, is called trisomy 21. Trisomy 18 and Trisomy 13, known as Edwards syndrome and Patau syndrome, respectively, are the two other autosomal trisomies recognized in live-born humans. Trisomy of the sex chromosomes is also possible, for example (47,XXX), (47,XXY), and (47,XYY).
4/5	tetrasomy/pentasomy	Tetrasomy and pentasomy are the presence of four or five copies of a chromosome, respectively. Although rarely seen with autosomes, sex chromosome tetrasomy and pentasomy have been reported in humans, including XXXX, XXXY, XXYY, XXXXX, XXXXY, and XYYYY.

== See also ==
- Chromosome abnormality
- Chromosome segregation
- Mosaic variegated aneuploidy syndrome
- Nondisjunction
- Ploidy
- Robertsonian translocation
