= Journal of Genetic Counseling =

- Cover of a 2024 issue of the Journal of Genetic Counseling
- Discipline: Genetic counseling
- Language: English
- Edited by: Jehannine Austin

Publication details
- History: 1992–present
- Publisher: John Wiley & Sons
- Frequency: Bimonthly
- Impact factor: 2.537 (2020)

Standard abbreviations
- ISO 4: J. Genet. Couns.

Indexing
- CODEN: JGCOET
- ISSN: 1059-7700 (print); 1573-3599 (web)
- OCLC no.: 24728238

Links
- Journal homepage

The Journal of Genetic Counseling is a bi-monthly peer-reviewed medical journal focusing on all aspects of genetic counseling, including the discipline itself and its practice. It is produced by the National Society of Genetic Counselors (NSGC), an American organization, and is currently published by John Wiley & Sons. The journal is considered an international forum for genetic counselors, legal scholars, social scientists, laboratory geneticists, and bioethicists. The founding editor-in-chief Deborah Eunpu was also a founding member of the NSGC. The current editor-in-chief is Jehannine Austin, a practicing genetic counselor and researcher. DNA Dialogues is a podcast produced by the journal, which covers articles published in the journal with their authors and further discusses them.

== Background ==
The journal was the first genetics journal to focus entirely on professional, familial, social and psychological facets of genetic counselling, and continues to be the only journal to do so. The similarly named journal, Genetic Counseling, focuses on the medical nuances of the field, rather than the counselling component.

The history of genetic counseling is firmly rooted in eugenics and the unethical practices in historical genetic research. Eugenics is the belief that the genetic quality of the human population is largely based on proximity to the racially-white, heterosexual, able-bodied male and those who do not conform to those characteristics should not reproduce, often resulting in forced sterilizations. In consideration of this history; equity, diversity, and inclusion principles are of special consideration. This focus extends to the editorial board of the journal, which highlights the diversity of genders, sexualities, cultures, races, and abilities of its members as a strength.

== Contents ==
The journal focuses exclusively on genetic counselling-related research, providing the premier resource for practitioners, educators, and policymakers in the field. The large proportion of the studies featured in the journal examines the roles of genetic counsellors and the impact of their practices on genetic counselling processes and outcomes. Moreover, the journal addresses individuals’ attitudes, perceptions, and emotions regarding genetic services and decision-making processes. In contrast to other medical journals (Genetics, Heredity, Nature Genetics, Theoretical and Applied Genetics, Journal of Genetics) studies focusing on molecular biology or underlying mechanisms are considered outside the scope of the journal.

The demographics of the studies predominantly consists of genetic counselling patients. Other demographics involved in the field, such as genetic counsellors, health professionals, and parents are also common study samples. The journal published a balanced array of studies utilizing quantitative, qualitative, or mixed analysis (a combination of both quantitative and qualitative analyses). Furthermore, It features a diverse range of research articles specifically focused on various genetic counseling specialities, with cancer (including breast, ovarian, and colorectal) being the most prevalent area. Other common specialties include prenatal and general genetics (covering a broad range of genetic referrals across different specialties), whereas the journal lacks research on laboratory genetic counselling.

== Publication ==
From 1992 to 2018, the JOGC was published through Springer Publishing Company. In 2019, the journal began publishing with Wiley. There are 6 publications per year released on a bimonthly basis. The complete issues of the journal can be accessed online for free by members of the NGSC.

== Editors ==
The position of Editor-in-Chief is appointed by the NSGC Board of Directors and typically serves a 5 year term. The primary responsibilities of the Editor is to assemble an editorial team, set the journal’s scope and vision, and oversee the publication of the issues.

The journal's current Editor-in-Chief is Jehannine Austin, a researcher and professor at the University of British Columbia, as of January 2024.

Previous editors of the journal:

- Christina Palmer (2018 - 2023)
- Bonnie S. LeRoy
- Allyn McConkie-Rosell
- Robert Resta (1995 - 2001)
- Deborah L. Eunpu (1992 - 1994)
