= Elective genetic and genomic testing =

DNA tests performed without definite indication

Elective genetic and genomic testing are DNA tests performed for an individual who does not have an indication for testing. An elective genetic test analyzes selected sites in the human genome while an elective genomic test analyzes the entire human genome. Some elective genetic and genomic tests require a physician to order the test to ensure that individuals understand the risks and benefits of testing as well as the results. Other DNA-based tests, such as a genealogical DNA test do not require a physician's order. Elective testing is generally not paid for by health insurance companies. With the advent of personalized medicine, also called precision medicine, an increasing number of individuals are undertaking elective genetic and genomic testing.

== History ==
Genetic testing for a variety of disorders has seen many advances starting with cytogenetics to evaluate human chromosomes for aneuploidy and other chromosome abnormalities. The development of molecular cytogenetics involving techniques such as fluorescence in situ hybridization (FISH) followed, permitting the detection of more subtle changes in the karyotype. Techniques to determine the precise sequence of nucleotides in DNA by DNA sequencing, notably Sanger sequencing was developed in the 1970s. In the 1980s the DNA microarray appeared, permitting laboratories to find copy number variants associated with disease that are below the level of detection of cytogenetics but too large to be detected by DNA sequencing. In recent years the development of high-throughput or next-generation sequencing has dramatically lowered the cost of DNA sequencing permitting laboratories to evaluate all 20,000 genes of the human genome at once through exome sequencing and whole genome sequencing. A catalogue of the many uses of these techniques can be found in the section: genetic testing. Most elective genetic and genomic testing employs either a DNA microarray or next-generation sequencing.

Historically, all laboratory tests were initiated and ordered by a physician or mandated by a state. Increasingly, patients and families have become more involved in their own health care. One outcome has been the growing availability of elective genetic and genomic testing that are initiated by a patient but still ordered by a physician. Additionally, elective genetic and genomic testing that does not require a physician's order called, direct-to-consumer genetic testing has recently entered the testing landscape.

== Testing categories ==
Genetic testing identifies changes in chromosomes, genes, or proteins; some are associated with human disease. There are many different clinical and non-clinical situations in which genetic testing is used.

=== Diagnostic testing ===
Diagnostic testing is used to identify or rule out a specific genetic or chromosomal condition when a particular disorder is suspected based on signs and symptoms present in the patient. Catalogues of more than 50,000 tests available worldwide can be found at GeneTests and Genetic Testing Registry.

=== Predictive and pre-symptomatic testing ===
Predictive and pre-symptomatic testing is carried out in individuals who do not have evidence of the disease under investigation. This testing includes Mendelian conditions and polygenic diseases.

=== Carrier testing ===
Carrier testing is used to identify people who carry one copy of a gene change (also referred to as a variant or mutation) that, when present in two copies, causes a genetic disorder. Carrier testing is typically offered to individuals who are considering pregnancy or are already pregnant, have a family history of a specific genetic disorder and to people in ethnic backgrounds that have an increased risk of specific genetic conditions.

=== Pre-implantation genetic diagnosis ===
Pre-implantation genetic diagnosis (PGD) is used in conjunction with in-vitro fertilization. In-vitro fertilization is the process of combining an egg (oocyte) and sperm outside of the body with intent of fertilization. PGD is the testing of individual oocytes or embryos for a known genetic condition prior to transferring the embryo to the uterus. Used together, IVF and PGD allow for selection of embryos or oocytes presumably unaffected with the condition. PGD can be utilized by individuals or couples who are affected by a condition of genetic origin, or if both individuals are found to be carriers of a recessive genetic condition.

=== Prenatal testing ===
Prenatal testing is diagnostic testing of a fetus before birth to detect abnormalities in the chromosomes or genes. Samples for this testing are obtained through invasive procedures such as amniocentesis or chorionic villus sampling. Prenatal testing is different from prenatal screening.

=== Newborn screening ===
Newborn screening screens infants a few days after birth to evaluate for evidence of treatable diseases. Most newborn screening uses tandem mass spectroscopy to detect biochemical abnormalities that suggest specific disorders. DNA-based newborn testing complements existing newborn screening methods and may replace it.

=== Pharmacogenomic testing ===
Pharmacogenomic tests (also called pharmacogenetics) provide information that can help predict how an individual will respond to a medication. Changes in certain genes affect drug pharmacodynamics (effects on drug receptors) and pharmacokinetics (drug uptake, distribution, and metabolism). Identifying these changes makes it possible to identify patients who are at increased risk for adverse effects from drugs or who are likely to be non-responders. Pharmacogenomic testing allows healthcare providers to tailor therapies by adjusting the dose or drug for an individual patient.

=== Identity testing ===
Identity testing is used to establish whether individuals are related to one another. It is commonly used to establish paternity but can be used to establish relatedness in adoption and immigration cases. It is also used in forensics.

=== Ancestry testing ===
Ancestry testing (also referred to as genetic genealogy) allows individuals to establish their country of origin and ethnic background and identify distant relatives and ancestors.

=== Trait testing ===
Some phenotypic traits in humans have a well established genetic basis, while others involve many genes or are a complex mix of genes and environment.

== Technologies ==
There are many different types of genetic testing that exist. Each is designed to look at different types of genetic changes that can occur. At present, no single genetic test can detect all types of genetic changes.

=== DNA sequencing ===
DNA sequencing is a method of testing that looks for single letter changes (single-nucleotide polymorphisms) in the genetic code. It can also determine when a small number of letters are missing (deletions) or extra (duplications). Sequencing may be performed on a single gene, a group of genes (panel testing), most of the coding region or exons (whole exome sequencing), or most of the genome (whole genome sequencing). With time, this technology is expected to be able to detect any abnormality of the human genome.

=== Genotyping ===
Genotyping is testing that looks at specific variants in a particular area of the genetic code. This technology is limited only to those specific variants that the test is designed to detect. SNP genotyping is a specific form of genotyping.

=== Deletion/duplication testing ===
Deletion/duplication testing is a type of testing designed to detect larger areas of the genetic code that are missing or extra. This technology does not detect single letter variants or very small deletions or duplications.

=== Panel testing ===
Panel testing refers to testing for a specific subset of genes most often related to a particular condition. This usually involves sequencing and may also include deletion/duplication analysis. This is often referred to as multigene panel testing because testing simultaneously examines a number of different genes. For example, an individual may have panel testing for a group of genes known to be associated with a particular type of cancer such hereditary colon cancer or hereditary breast and ovarian cancer.

=== Array or microarrays ===
Array or DNA microarrays look at copy number changes (missing or extra genetic material). This testing looks across a large portion of the genome for larger deletions or duplications (also referred to as copy number variation). This technology can not detect single letter changes or very small deletions or duplications.

=== Chromosome analysis/karyotype ===
Chromosome analysis, also known as karyotyping refers to testing that assesses whether the expected number of chromosomes are present, whether there is any rearrangement of the chromosomes, and also whether there are any large deletions or duplications. This technology can not detect single letter changes (single nucleotide variants) or small deletions or duplications.

=== Noninvasive prenatal screening (NIPT) using cell-free fetal DNA ===
Non-invasive prenatal screening screens for specific chromosomal abnormalities such as Down Syndrome in a fetus using cell-free DNA. This screening can also provide information about fetal sex and rhesus (Rh) blood type. A blood sample is drawn from the pregnant mother. This sample contains DNA from the mother and fetus. The amount of fetal DNA is assessed to determine if there is extra fetal genetic material present that may indicate an increased risk that the fetus has Down Syndrome or other selected conditions. As this is a screening test, other diagnostic tests such as amniocentesis or chorionic villus sampling are needed to confirm a diagnosis.

=== Newborn screening ===
Newborn screening is a type of testing that assesses risk for certain genetic, endocrine, metabolic disorders, hearing loss and critical congenital heart defects. Each state determines the exact list of conditions that are screened. Early detection, diagnosis, and intervention can prevent death or disability and enable children to reach their full potential. The testing is performed from a few drops of blood collected in the newborn period, often by a heel stick. The exact method of testing may vary but often uses levels of specific analytes present in the blood of the baby. Because this is a screening test, additional testing is often necessary to confirm a diagnosis.

== Pros and cons ==
People choose to have genetic testing for many reasons. Testing may be beneficial whether the test identifies a gene change or not. A negative result can eliminate the need for unnecessary checkups and screening tests in some cases. A positive result can direct a person toward available screening, management or treatment options.

=== Pros ===
,

- Determine an individual's risk to develop a genetic condition. By identifying gene changes that may increase risk to develop a certain condition, a person can be screened earlier and more frequently for the disease and/or could make changes to health habits such as diet and exercise
- Diagnose a genetic condition
- Confirm an existing or suspected clinical diagnosis
- Determine the severity of a disease by identifying the type of genetic mutation
- Help doctors choose the most appropriate medication or treatment plan
- Family planning
- Identify gene changes that could be passed on to children
- Screen embryos or newborn babies for certain genetic conditions. Such a genetic test can help people to make informed choices about their future, such as whether to have a baby, consider an egg or sperm donor, etc.

=== Cons ===
,

- False security. A negative test result does not mean you do not have the condition or are not at risk. There may be many reasons a test is unable to identify a genetic change.
- Expensive and may not be covered by insurance
- May be seen by insurance companies. No protection to long-term care insurance, disability insurance or life insurance
- Ethical issues. Because genetic testing informs a patient about their genetic information, which is shared with other family members, sometimes a genetic test result may have implications for blood relatives of the person who had testing. See ethical issues/considerations.

== Importance of family history ==
A patient's family history also known as genealogy, can provide important insight into medical conditions within the family. Given that many conditions have a genetic component, gathering an accurate family history can provide important information about an individual's personal risk for many diseases. Healthcare providers can use family history information to assess a patient's risk for disease, recommend testing or screening, suggest diet or other lifestyle habits that may help reduce risk, as well as assess risk of passing conditions on to children. When obtaining a family history, it is helpful to gather health information for the following family members: grandparents, parents, siblings, aunts, uncles and first cousins, and children. In the genetic counseling community this is often referred to as a three generation family history.

Important information to gather about the individuals in the family include:

- History of conditions including common conditions like heart disease, diabetes, cancer and known genetic conditions like cystic fibrosis or hemophilia or birth defects
- Specific information about the conditions should include: age of onset, specific type of cancer, risk factors (smoking, exposures)
- Cause and age of death
- Ethnic background

Some families decide to work together to develop a family history, however, some family members may feel uncomfortable disclosing personal medical information. A number of tools are available to gather family history information. Patients should ask their healthcare provider if their institution has a specific form they prefer to have filled out. The U.S. Surgeon General has created a computerized tool called My Family Health Portrait to help patients create a family medical history.

== Ethical issues ==
=== Informed consent ===
Prior to undergoing elective genetic testing, there are many factors that an individual should consider including the scope of testing and potential results in terms of changes to medical management, risk to family members, and impact on legal and financial matters.

=== Family implications ===
- Family sharing. The implications of genetic test results for other family members are important to consider in patients considering elective genetic testing. Unlike most other medical tests, genetic testing may reveal health information about the patient as well as his or her family members. This may include information which explains a current medical condition, predicts future disease risk, or impacts risks to the next generation. For this reason, it is advised that patients be counseled about potential familial implications prior to genetic testing and provided with support for discussing their results with family members.
- Nonpaternity/Consanguinity. In some cases, genetic testing may reveal that an individual's mother or father is not actually a biological parent. In other instances, testing may reveal that an individual's parents are closely related to each other. Whether or not this information is reported may differ between testing laboratories. Due to the potential for psychological harm in unexpectedly receiving this type of result, it is important for individuals undergoing testing to be counseled on the possibility of a finding of nonpaternity or consanguinity.

=== Genetic discrimination ===
Many patients are concerned about the possibility of genetic discrimination, the idea that certain individuals or entities would use a patient's genetic information against him or her in order to make employment, insurance policies, or other activities and services difficult or impossible to obtain. In 2008, a new federal law known as the Genetic Information Nondiscrimination Act (GINA) went into effect to help prevent such discrimination. GINA prohibits the use of genetic information to discriminate in health insurance and employment. GINA does not prevent all types of discrimination, however. For companies with fewer than 15 employees, these employment protections do not apply. GINA's protections do not apply to the US military or to federal government employees. Additionally, life, disability, and long-term care insurance policies are not included among GINA's protections. These may still continue to use genetic information to determine one's eligibility for coverage and/or policy premiums. Because of these important exceptions, an individual considering elective genetic testing should discuss the possibility of genetic discrimination with his or her physician or genetic counselor. Some individuals choose to have certain insurance policies in place before undergoing whole genome sequencing so as to prevent future discrimination.

=== Secondary findings ===
When undergoing elective genetic testing, patients may expect to receive a variety of different results. In addition to results that may explain a particular symptom or answer a specific question the patient may have had, the scope of elective testing may reveal additional information. These “secondary findings” may include information about increased risk for both treatable and untreatable genetic diseases, carrier status for recessive conditions, and pharmacogenetic information. Most laboratories permit patients and families to decide what types of secondary findings (if any), they would like to receive. It is critical that patients understand the scope of potential results from elective testing and have the opportunity to opt in or out of various results.

=== Limitations ===
When considering elective genetic testing, it is important to take into account the type and goals of testing. Providers and patients should be familiar with differing testing methodologies the potential results from each test. For many individuals, factors such as test cost, scope, and deliverables, in combination with their specific clinical questions, play into the decision to undergo elective testing. It is also important to recognize that potential results from elective genetic testing are constrained by the current limits of medical knowledge concerning the association between genetics and human disease. As knowledge of rare genetic factors that confer high risk, as well as common factors that confer lower risks, increases, we will have the ability to learn more about an individual's current and future health.

== How do I find a geneticist or genetic counselor? ==
Due to their advanced training, genetic counselors have a unique set of skills. Their clinical and psychosocial skills are used to help patients understand their genetic risks, determine which tests are most appropriate for their needs, and explain what the possible test results could mean for both the patient and the family. Clinical geneticists often work in tandem with a genetic counselor and play an important role in providing genetic testing, interpreting test results, and explaining the results. Given the ever-increasing number of elective genetic and genomic tests offered and the wide variety of issues raised by these tests (see pros & cons above), discussion with a clinical geneticist or genetic counselor may be helpful. Directories of genetics professionals can be found through the American College of Medical Genetics and Genomics and the National Society of Genetic Counselors.

== Future ==
Elective genetic and genomic testing will continue to evolve as the cost of genetic testing technology falls and patients become increasingly involved in their own health care. The rapid drop in cost of whole exome sequencing and whole genome sequencing in the last five years has resulted in the initiation of several large scale sequencing studies that are systematically evaluating the benefits and limitations of elective genetic and genomic testing. Many of these studies have specifically focused on healthy individuals pursuing elective WES or WGS.

Other driving forces in the adoption of this type of testing include continued social empowerment of patients regarding their own health care and increasing private and government funded sequencing projects focused on better understanding the biological, environment, and behavioral factors that drive common disease with the hope of developing more effective ways to treat and manage disease. The Million Veteran Program is one example of a government funded project aimed at collecting data from veterans using questionnaires, health record information, and blood samples for testing, including genetic testing. Aimed at recruiting 1 million or more Americans to participate in the research cohort, The Precision Medicine Initiative will have a large impact on public awareness of precision medicine and the importance of using genetic information to treat and manage disease as well as optimize health. While elective testing is typically not paid for by health insurance companies, this may change as clinical utility continues to be demonstrated.

Future applications for elective genetic and genomic testing may include:

- Expanded prenatal testing options such as prenatal whole genome sequencing and whole exome sequencing
- Routine whole genome sequencing for all newborns
- Increasing availability of direct to consumer testing options

== See also ==
- Personalized medicine
- Personal genomics
- Whole genome sequencing
- Whole exome sequencing
- Genetic counseling
- Genomic counseling
- List of genetic disorders
- Genetic Information Nondiscrimination Act
