= Lecithin–sphingomyelin ratio =

Test of fetal amniotic fluid to assess for lung immaturity

- Sphingomyelin

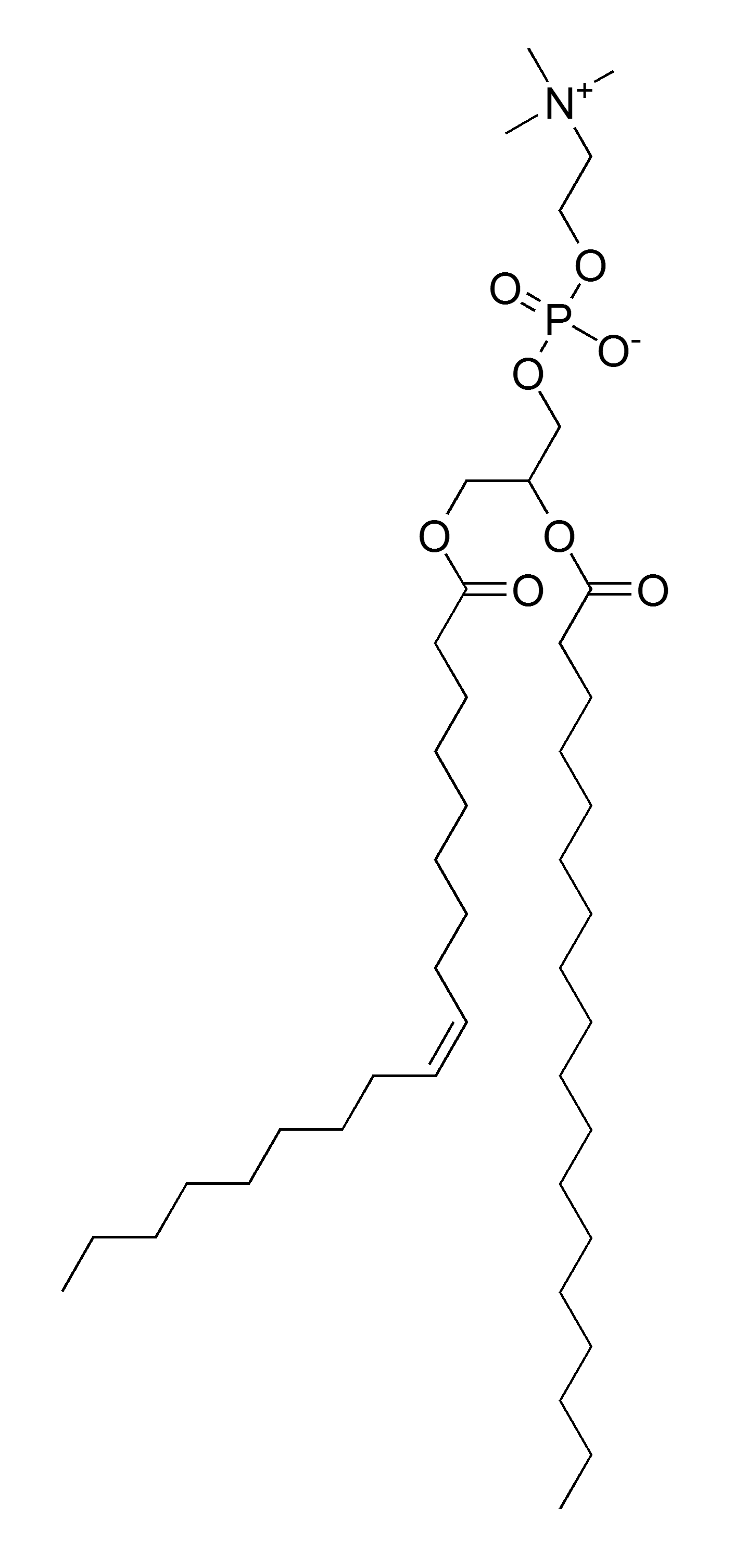
Phosphatidylcholine, a type of phospholipid in lecithin.

The lecithin–sphingomyelin ratio (L/S ratio or L-S ratio) is a test of fetal amniotic fluid to assess for fetal lung immaturity. Lungs require surfactant, a soap-like substance, to lower the surface tension of the fluid coating the alveolar epithelium in the lungs. This is especially important for premature babies trying to expand their lungs after birth. Surfactant is a mixture of lipids, proteins, and glycoproteins, lecithin and sphingomyelin being two of them. Lecithin makes the surfactant mixture more effective.

== Evaluation ==
The lecithin–sphingomyelin ratio is a marker of fetal lung maturity. The outward flow of pulmonary secretions from the fetal lungs into the amniotic fluid maintains the level of lecithin and sphingomyelin equally until 32–33 weeks gestation, when the lecithin concentration begins to increase significantly while sphingomyelin remains nearly the same. As such, if a sample of amniotic fluid has a higher ratio, it indicates that there is more surfactant in the lungs and the baby will have less difficulty breathing at birth. An L–S ratio of 2.4 or more indicates fetal lung maturity and a relatively low risk of infant respiratory distress syndrome, and an L/S ratio of less than 1.5 is associated with a high risk of infant respiratory distress syndrome.

If preterm delivery is necessary (as evaluated by a biophysical profile or other tests) and the L–S ratio is low, the mother may need to receive steroids such as betamethasone to hasten the fetus' surfactant production in the lungs.

== Procedure ==
An amniotic fluid sample is collected via amniocentesis and the sample is spun down in a centrifuge at 1000 rpm for 3–5 minutes. Thin layer chromatography (TLC) is performed on the supernatant, which separates out the components. Lecithin and sphingomyelin are relatively easy to identify on TLC and the predictive value of the test is good.

== See also ==
- Phosphatidylglycerol – another amniotic fluid marker of fetal lung maturity
- Surfactant-albumin ratio
- Lamellar body count
