= Joan H. Marks =

American genetic counseling advocate (1929–2020)

- Born: Joan H. Rosen; February 4, 1929; Portland, Maine, U.S.
- Died: September 14, 2020 (aged 91)
- Education: Sarah Lawrence College (BA); Simmons University (MS)
- Occupations: Educator, Health Advocate
- Spouse: Paul Marks
- Children: 3

Joan H. Marks (February 4, 1929 – September 14, 2020) was an American educator and genetic counseling advocate. She wrote several papers in support of the then-burgeoning field of genetic counseling and was the longest-serving director of Sarah Lawrence College's Human Genetic graduate program, the first of its kind in the United States.

== Biography ==
=== Career ===
Marks joined the Sarah Lawrence College Human Genetics program in 1972, becoming its program director in 1973. Marks went on to serve as the director of the program for 26 years, retiring in 1998. She was succeeded by Caroline Lieber. During her time as the director she was an active advocate for genetic counseling, giving talks and writing articles arguing for the importance of genetic counseling.

During her tenure, she transitioned the curriculum of the program from "basic science courses" to a greater focus on counseling until "the counseling component of the curriculum soon matched the number of hours devoted to the sciences." She also grew the program to be the largest in the nation, which it continues to be to this day.

=== Marriage and children ===
Joan Marks was married to Paul Marks for 67 years and had 3 children.

== Published works ==
- Marks, Joan H., and Melissa L. Richter. "The genetic associate: a new health professional." American Journal of Public Health 66.4 (1976): 388–390.
- Marks, Joan H. "Education and training of health professionals in genetics." Birth defects original article series 13.6 (1977): 127.
- Marks, Joan H. "Know your genes." American Journal of Human Genetics 29.6 (1977): 649.
- Marks, Joan H. "Masters level training programs for genetic counselors: an eight year report." Service and Education in Medical Genetics. Academic Press. New York (1979).
- Marks, Joan H. "Service and Education in Medical Genetics." Service and Education in Medical Genetics: Proceedings of the Seventh Annual New York State Health Department Birth Defects Symposium. No. 8. Academic Press, 1979.
- Marks, Joan H., and Hendin, David. "The Genetic Connection: How to Protect Your Family Against Hereditary Disease." United States, New American Library, 1979.
- Marks, Joan H. "A New Career Option for Biology Students." The American Biology Teacher 42.8 (1980): 468–470.
- Marks, Joan H. "Caring for the Whole Patient: Health Advocacy." Connecticut medicine 45.2 (1981): 103–106.
- Marks, Joan H. “Developing a Graduate Program in Health Advocacy.” Grant Proposals That Succeeded, 1983, pp. 119–121., doi:10.1007/978-1-4899-0411-9_13.
- Marks, Joan H., "Advocacy in Health Care: The Power of a Silent Constituency." United States, Humana Press, 1986.
- Marks, Joan H., et al. "Genetic counseling principles in action: a casebook." Birth defects original article series 25.5 (1989): 1.
- Marks, Joan H., and Mary H. Miller. "Reproductive Health Technology and Genetic Counseling." Handbook of Women's Sexual and Reproductive Health. Springer, Boston, MA, 2002. 417–436.
- King, Mary-Claire, Joan H. Marks, and Jessica B. Mandell. "Breast and ovarian cancer risks due to inherited mutations in BRCA1 and BRCA2." Science 302.5645 (2003): 643–646.
- Ciarleglio, Leslie J., et al. "Genetic counseling throughout the life cycle." The Journal of clinical investigation 112.9 (2003): 1280–1286.
- Bennett, Robin L., et al. "Genetic counselors: translating genomic science into clinical practice." The Journal of clinical investigation 112.9 (2003): 1274–1279.
- Marks, Joan H. "The Importance of Genetic Counseling** Previously presented at the annual meeting of The American Society of Human Genetics, in Los Angeles, on November 8, 2003." The American Journal of Human Genetics 3.74 (2004): 395–396.
- Marks, Joan H. "The training of genetic counselors: Origins of a psychosocial model." Genetic Counseling. Routledge, 2017. 15–24.

== Honours, decorations, awards and distinctions ==
- Honorary Doctor of Science (Sc.D.) degree from Sarah Lawrence College in 2019
- American Society of Human Genetics Award for Excellence in Medical Genetics Education in 2003
