= Maryam Jafarkhani Kermani =

Associate professor & Iranian scientist

Dr. Maryam Jafarkhani Kermani
- Occupation: Associate Professor

Academic background
- Education: Ph.D. Bioscience
- Website: http://tissue.abrii.ac.ir/en/ShowMember/33/Maryam--Jafarkhani-Kermani

Maryam Jafarkhani Kermani (Persian: مریم جعفرخانی کرمانی) is an associate professor in the Department of Tissue and Cell Culture at the Administration of Agriculture and Biotechnology Research Institute of Iran (ABRII). She is an Iranian scientist whose main research area is agricultural tissue culture and mainly studies plants in the Rosaceous family.

Kermani has served as the Head of Technology Transfer at ABRII for more than 5 years. She is an elected member of the board of Iranian Society for Ornamental Plants, a member of the board of directors of Iranian Society of Ornamental Plants (ISOP), a former editor in chief of the Iranian Journal of Ornamental Plants (IJOP), and the Coordinator of ECO Agricultural Biotechnology Network.

== Education ==
Kermani graduated with a Ph.D. in Bioscience, more specifically plant biotechnology, from the University of East London, UK, and completed a postdoctoral fellowship at King's College, London University, UK.

== Scientific achievements ==
- Production of four new varieties of roses: Two new tetraploids from diploid roses and three new hexaploids from triploid roses.
- Patent in Iran: A protocol for mass production of apple rootstocks.
- Patent in Iran: A protocol to induce chromosome doubling in plants.
- Patent in Iran: A protocol for mass production of 15 rose cultivars
- Publication of more than 30 research papers in the international Journals
- Publication of more than 10 research papers in the national Journals
- The protocol for mass production of apple rootstocks using tissue culture
- The protocol for micropropagation of large-fruit jujube-tree (Ziziphus jujuba)
- Completion of 30 Research Projects
- Supervising of more than 30 MSc and PhD students
- Holding and lecturing scientific of more than 10 workshops

=== Scientific achievements at pilot stage ===
- Virus elimination and detection in apple rootstocks and cultivars

== Awards ==
- Receiving the award from the President of Iran in 2008
- Receiving the award from the Minister of Agriculture of Iran in 2010
- Title of top researcher of the Ministry of Agriculture of Iran in 2010

== See also ==
- List of King's College London alumni
- Theoretical and Applied Genetics
- Economic Cooperation Organization
