= Amniocentesis =

Sampling of amniotic fluid done mainly to detect fetal chromosomal abnormalities

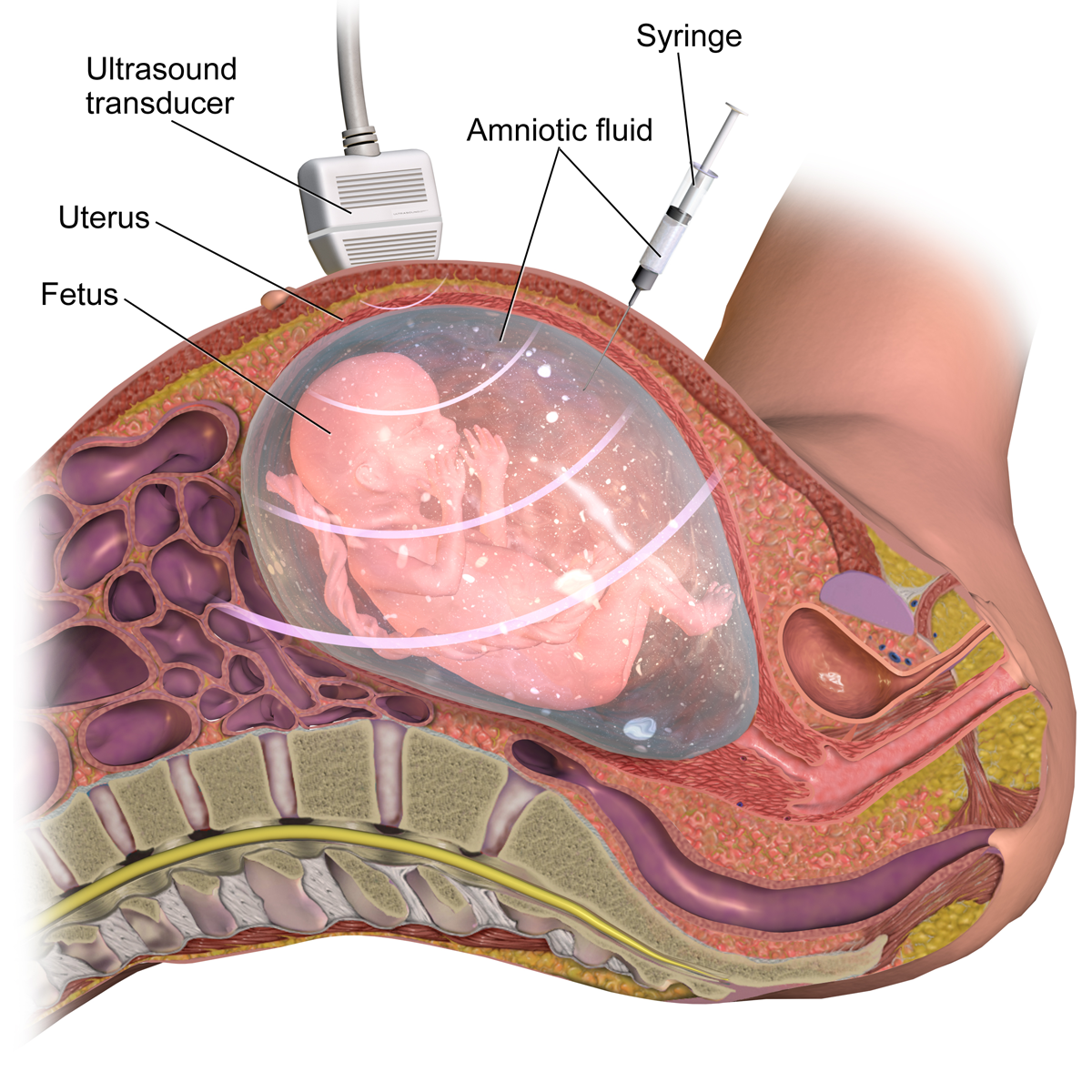
- Amniocentesis
- Other names: Amniotic fluid test (AFT)
- ICD-9-CM: 75.1
- MeSH: D000649
- MedlinePlus: 003921

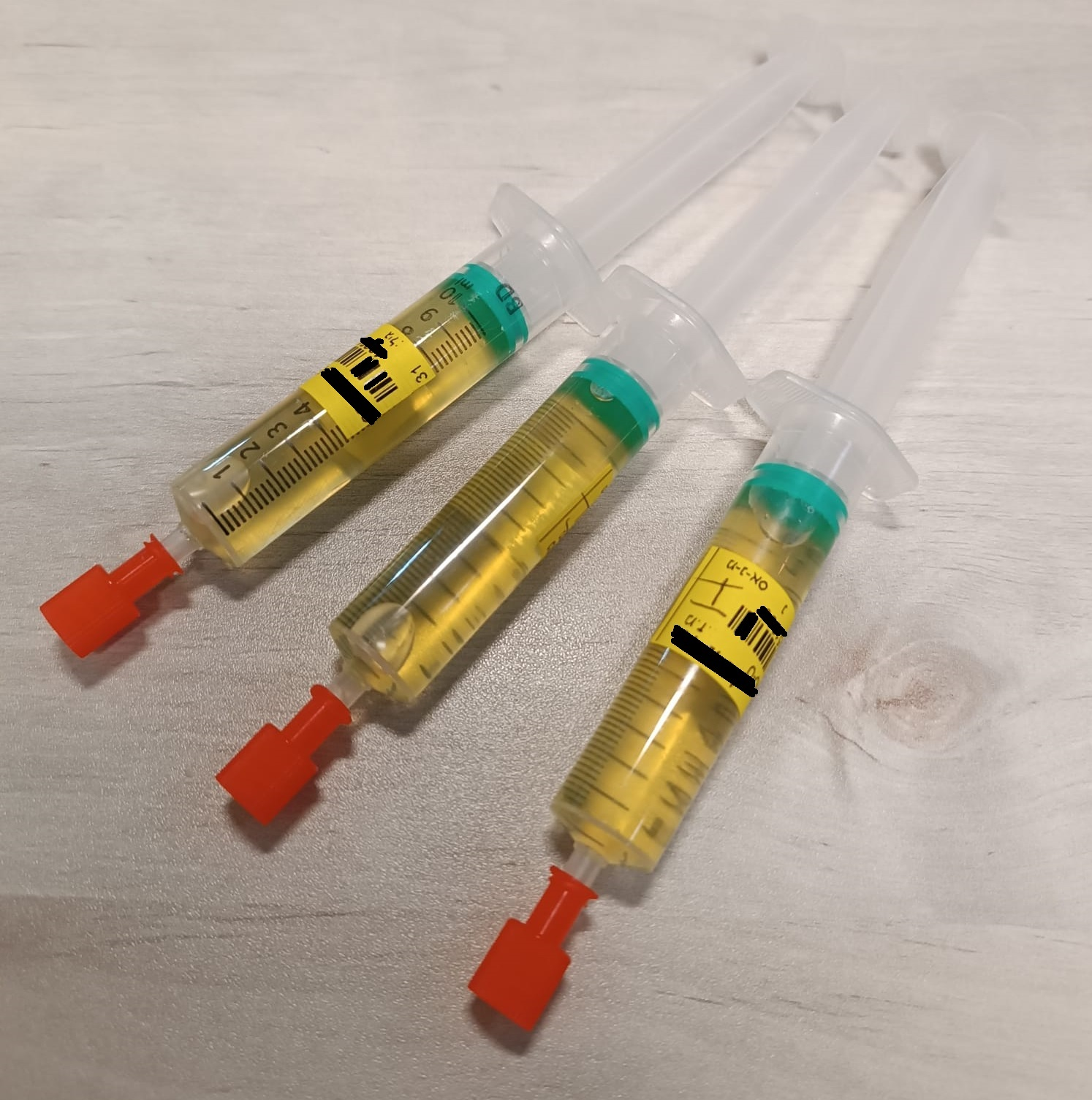
Tubes filled with amniotic fluid for amniocentesis

Amniocentesis or amniotic fluid test (AFT) is a medical procedure used primarily in the prenatal diagnosis of genetic conditions. It has other uses such as in the assessment of infection and fetal lung maturity. Prenatal diagnostic testing, which includes amniocentesis, is necessary to conclusively diagnose the majority of genetic disorders, with amniocentesis being the gold-standard procedure after 15 weeks' gestation.

In this procedure, a thin needle is inserted into the abdomen of the pregnant woman. The needle punctures the amnion, which is the membrane that surrounds the developing fetus. The fluid within the amnion is called amniotic fluid, and because this fluid surrounds the developing fetus, it contains fetal cells. The amniotic fluid is sampled and analyzed via methods such as karyotyping and DNA analysis technology for genetic abnormalities.

An amniocentesis is typically performed in the second trimester between the 15th and 20th week of gestation. Women who choose to have this test are primarily those at increased risk for genetic and chromosomal problems, in part because the test is invasive and carries a 0.1% to 0.3% risk of pregnancy loss with the risk of pregnancy loss being much higher if the procedure is performed before 15 weeks. However, the American College of Obstetricians and Gynecologists recommends that all women be offered prenatal assessment for aneuploidy, or the presence of an abnormal number of chromosomes, by either genetic screening or diagnostic testing independent of maternal age or risk factors. There are relative contraindications to performing an amniocentesis, however no absolute contraindications have been identified.

Physicians have used the process of inserting a needle transabdominal into the uterus to extract amniotic fluid for the management of hydramnios, or excess amniotic fluid, as early as the late 1800s.

== Medical uses ==
Amniocentesis may be performed for both diagnostic and therapeutic reasons.

=== Diagnostic indications ===
==== Genetic diagnosis ====
The American College of Obstetricians and Gynecologists recommends that all women be offered prenatal assessment for aneuploidy by either genetic screening or diagnostic testing independent of maternal age or risk factors. Prenatal genetic screening is intended to identify patients who are at increased risk of having a fetus with a genetic condition while prenatal genetic diagnostic testing detects whether a specific genetic condition is present in the fetus with high accuracy. Amniocentesis, along with chorionic villus sampling, are examples of prenatal diagnostic tests. Amniocentesis or chorionic villus sampling is necessary to conclusively diagnose the majority of genetic disorders, with amniocentesis being the gold-standard procedure after 15 weeks' gestation. Transabdominal chorionic villus sampling is an alternative to amniocentesis if genetic diagnostic testing is to be performed in the first trimester between ten and 15 weeks' gestation. Prenatal genetic testing cannot identify all possible fetal genetic abnormalities or their outcomes. When deciding on whether to perform invasive genetic diagnostic testing such as amniocentesis, patients and their physicians should participate in a shared-decision-making process that takes into account a patient's individual risk profile and preferences.

Amniocentesis may be offered to certain patients at higher risk of having a fetus with a genetic disorder. Factors that may place patients at increased risk of fetal genetic disorders include older maternal or paternal age, parental carrier of a balanced chromosomal rearrangement, parental aneuploidy or aneuploidy mosaicism, parental carrier of a genetic disorder, prior child with a structural birth defect, previous fetus or child with autosomal trisomy or sex chromosome aneuploidy, ultrasonographic evidence of a fetus with structural abnormalities, and a high-risk genetic screening test result.

Analysis of samples obtained from amniocentesis is accomplished via karyotyping and DNA analysis technology. Examples of conditions that may be detected include chromosomal abnormalities such as common aneuploidies like trisomy 13, trisomy 18, trisomy 21, Turner syndrome, and Klinefelter syndrome. Micro-deletions or micro-duplications, such as DiGeorge syndrome and Cri-du-Chat syndrome, sex-linked disorders, such as hemophilia and Duchenne muscular dystrophy, and specific genetic mutations previously demonstrated to be present in a family or suspected based on fetal ultrasound findings, such as sickle cell disease, Tay–Sachs disease, neurofibromatosis, and cystic fibrosis.

==== Assessment of fetal lung maturity ====
Amniocentesis has traditionally been performed to assess the extent of fetal lung development in the context of medical and obstetrical complications, with the intention of delivering the fetus if fetal lung maturity is demonstrated. Lack of fetal lung maturity increases the risk of infant respiratory distress syndrome.

Fetal lung development can be tested by sampling the amount of surfactant in the amniotic fluid obtained via amniocentesis. Several tests are available, including the lecithin-sphingomyelin ratio ("L/S ratio"), the presence of phosphatidylglycerol (PG), and the surfactant/albumin (S/A) ratio. An L/S ratio of 2.0 is associated with a lower incidence of infant respiratory distress syndrome.

The efficacy of performing amniocentesis for the assessment of fetal lung maturity has been called into question. The Eunice Kennedy Shriver National Institute of Child Health and Human Development and the Society for Maternal-Fetal Medicine's joint statement on the matter states that "if significant maternal or fetal risks exist, delivery should occur regardless of biochemical maturity and if delivery could be deferred owing to absence of pulmonary maturity there is not a stringent indication for prompt delivery." Based on this rationale, the risks associated with amniocentesis, and the limited indications, performing amniocenteses for assessing fetal lung maturity may become obsolete except in instances where gestational age is unknown.

==== Assessment and management of infection ====
Chorioamnionitis, or intraamniotic infection, is an infection of any combination of the amniotic fluid, placenta, fetus, fetal membranes, or decidua. The gold standard for diagnosing chorioamnionitis is via a gram stain, glucose level, or culture of the amniotic fluid obtained via amniocentesis. However, in clinical practice, performing an amniocentesis for the purpose of diagnosing chorioamnionitis is rare and instead diagnosed based on clinical signs to ensure prompt treatment and to avoid invasive prenatal testing.

Amniocentesis can be used to detect other congenital infections such as cytomegalovirus, hepatitis B, parvovirus B19, and toxoplasmosis.

==== Assessment of severity of Rh isoimmunization ====
The Rh factor is an inherited protein found on the surface of red blood cells. If the mother is Rh negative and the father is Rh positive, a fetus has at least a 50% chance of being Rh positive. Rh incompatibility occurs when a mother has Rh-negative blood and her baby has Rh-positive blood. If the red blood cells of an Rh positive fetus cross into their Rh negative mother's blood flow, the mother is at risk of Rh sensitization, a process in which maternal antibodies form against red blood cell Rh antigens. Events causing fetomaternal hemorrhage, such as miscarriage, trauma to the abdomen during pregnancy, ectopic pregnancy, induced abortion, invasive pregnancy procedures, labor, and birth can lead to fetal Rh positive red blood cells entering the Rh negative maternal circulation. Rh sensitization typically does not cause problems during the first pregnancy of an Rh negative woman. However, in a subsequent pregnancy with an Rh positive fetus, the formed antibodies can cross the placenta and attack the red blood cells of the fetus, a process called Rh isoimmunization that can result in a condition known as Rhesus disease or hemolytic disease of the fetus and newborn.

Hemolytic disease of the fetus and newborn can lead to varying degrees of fetal anemia, which can potentially have devastating consequences including newborn jaundice, kernicterus, hydrops fetalis, and intrauterine fetal demise. RhD immune globulin (RhoGam) is administered to prevent maternal Rh sensitization in Rh negative patients that are non-sensitized to Rh antigens.

In the past, serial amniocenteses has been used to monitor isoimmunized pregnancies by measuring the levels of bilirubin, a byproduct of red blood cell breakdown, present in amniotic fluid using spectrophotometry. However, ultrasound detecting middle cerebral artery peak systolic velocity has now replaced serial amniocenteses for the management of isoimmunized pregnancies.

Amniocentesis is an invasive prenatal test that has the potential to cause maternal and fetal blood cell mixing, which can worsen Rh isoimmunization.

=== Therapeutic indications ===
==== Decompression of polyhydramnios ====
Polyhydramnios is an excessive accumulation of amniotic fluid that can lead to serious perinatal and maternal outcomes such as intrauterine fetal demise, preterm labor, premature rupture of membranes, and cesarean delivery. Physicians have used the process of inserting a needle transabdominally into the uterus to extract excess amniotic fluid, also known as a reductive amniocentesis or decompression, for the management of polyhydramnios as early as the late 1800s.

Reductive amniocentesis is currently indicated for severe cases of polyhydramnios only.

==== Decompression in twin oligohydramnios-polyhydramnios sequence (TOPS) ====
Twin oligohydramnios-polyhydramnios sequence is a rare condition that may occur when twins sharing a single placenta develop significant vascular cross-connections, known as anastomoses, resulting in blood flowing away from one twin to the other. This process can result in polyhydramnios in one twin and oligohydramnios in the other twin. Amniocentesis has been employed to reduce the volume in the sac with polyhydramnios in order to relieve amniotic fluid pressures, a process that may improving fetal circulation and outcomes.

==== Stem cells ====
Amniotic fluid, which is easily collected, cultured, and stored through cryopreservation, can be a rich source of pluripotent and multipotent mesenchymal, hematopoietic, neural, epithelial, and endothelial stem cells. A potential benefit of using amniotic stem cells over those obtained from embryos is that they address the ethical concerns among anti-abortion activists by obtaining pluripotent lines of undifferentiated cells without harm to a fetus or destruction of an embryo. In addition, the use of embryonic cells has been shown to develop into tumors such as teratocarcinomas and frequently acquire chromosomal errors, underscoring the benefits of utilizing amniotic stem cells.

Research has shown that cells from second trimester amniotic fluid are successful at differentiating into various cell lines.

Artificial heart valves, working tracheas, as well as muscle, fat, bone, heart, neural and liver cells have all been engineered through use of amniotic stem cells. Tissues obtained from amniotic cell lines show significant promise for patients with congenital diseases/malformations of the heart, liver, lungs, kidneys, and cerebral tissue.

The first amniotic stem cells bank in the US is active in Boston, Massachusetts.

== Contraindications ==
There are no absolute contraindications to amniocentesis. Relative contraindications to the procedure include failure to discontinue anticoagulation therapy 48–72 hours prior to amniocentesis, infections such as hepatitis B, hepatitis C, or human immunodeficiency virus (HIV), and oligohydramnios. These patients are at a higher risk of complications if they undergo amniocentesis and should be counseled appropriately. In some cases, the advantages of obtaining the results of an amniocentesis may outweigh the increased risk of complications.

Patients on oral anticoagulation therapy have an increased risk of bleeding from the procedure and may be switched to low-molecular-weight heparin, which carries a lower risk for bleeding complications, prior to amniocentesis. There is an increased risk of mother-to-child (vertical) transmission of bloodborne infections in patients with hepatitis B, hepatitis C, or HIV after amniocentesis. Patients with high viral loads are at a greater risk of vertical transmission of hepatitis B compared to patients with low viral loads. In patients living with HIV, amniocentesis should be deferred until a combined antiretroviral therapy (CART) regimen is established and the patient achieves a low or undetectable viral load.

While not a contraindication, an amniocentesis may be postponed if fusion of the amnion and chorion has not yet occurred. Performing an amniocentesis prior to the fusion of the amnion and chorion is more likely to lead to procedure failure that may require further sampling attempts.

== Risks and complications ==
Amniocentesis performed for the purpose of prenatal diagnostic testing for genetic disorders has been established as a safe and accurate procedure. The risks and complications associated with amniocentesis include pregnancy loss, preterm labor and delivery, preterm premature rupture of membranes (PPROM), fetal injuries, Rhesus disease, and amniotic fluid embolism. Oligohydramnios, fetomaternal hemorrhage, cell culture failure, multiple amniotic fluid extraction attempts, and infections are also possible complications. Additional maternal complications include vaginal bleeding, hematoma of the skin, damage to surrounding internal organs, procedural pain including stinging, pressure, and cramping, and post-procedure discomfort.

A serious risk of amniocentesis is pregnancy loss. The American College of Obstetricians and Gynecologists note that the pregnancy loss rates attributable to amniocentesis are very low. The mechanism for pregnancy loss following amniocentesis is unknown but may be a consequence of bleeding, infection, or trauma to the fetus or the amniotic sac as a result of the procedure. Studies from 2000 to 2006 estimated the procedure-related pregnancy loss at 0.6-0.86%. The most recent systematic review of the literature and updated meta-analysis on the risk of pregnancy loss following amniocentesis was published in 2019. This study cites the amniocentesis-related pregnancy loss to be 0.30% (95% CI, 0.11–0.49%).

The incidence of amniocentesis-related complications, including pregnancy loss and procedure failure, may be mitigated when performed by experienced practitioners who complete 100 or more amniocenteses per year. Experienced practitioners are more likely to complete the procedure with only one puncture attempt. Multiple needle insertion attempts are associated with an increased risk of pregnancy loss. Early amniocentesis, defined as performing the procedure between 10 and 13 weeks' gestation, is associated with significantly higher rates of pregnancy loss following amniocentesis. Early amniocentesis also has higher rates of other complications, including membrane rupture, clubfoot, and amniotic fluid culture failure. For these reasons, the American College of Obstetricians and Gynecologists and other similar professional associations recommend against undergoing amniocentesis prior to 14 weeks' gestation.

In the past, twin pregnancies have been noted to have a higher rate of pregnancy loss (estimated at 3.07%) following amniocentesis. Past literature has shown that twin pregnancies increase the background risk of fetal loss following amniocentesis before 24 weeks' gestation by 1%. Although data on complications following amniocentesis in twin pregnancies continues to be limited, the American College of Obstetricians and Gynecologists note that rate of pregnancy loss due to amniocentesis in this population is estimated to be around 2%. A 2020 systematic review and meta-analysis showed similar findings, noting that pregnancy loss following amniocentesis may be lower than previously reported in twin pregnancies. The study also found no significant difference in rates of pregnancy loss between twin pregnancies that underwent amniocentesis and those that did not before 24 weeks of gestation.

Maternal factors that may further increase the risk of pregnancy loss following amniocentesis include:

- Presence of uterine fibroids
- Presence of Müllerian anomalies, which are a group of congenital defects affecting the development of the female reproductive tract
- Active vaginal infection
- Maternal body-mass index greater than 40 kg/m^{2}
- Multiparity, or 3 or more childbirths
- History of 3 or more pregnancy losses
- Carrying a fetus with structural malformations

Undergoing amniocentesis in the third trimester has been associated with an increased risk of preterm labor, as defined as the onset of labor between 20 and 37 weeks' gestation, and preterm delivery. Preterm premature rupture of membranes (PPROM) and subsequent leakage of amniotic fluid are additional possible complications, with the procedure-related PPROM rate following amniocentesis estimated to be between 1–2%. When compared to cases of spontaneous PPROM, patients with amniocentesis-related PPROM experience better outcomes and lower rates of pregnancy loss. Leakage of amniotic fluid can result in oligohydramnios, or an amniotic fluid volume that is less than the minimum expected for gestational age. Adequate amniotic fluid volumes are essential for fetal lung development. Therefore, possible consequences of oligohydramnios include infant respiratory distress and small, underdeveloped lungs known as fetal lung hypoplasia.

Needle injuries to the fetus are increasingly rare due to the practice of using continuous ultrasound-guidance, including during needle insertion and amniotic fluid extraction. Reported needle injuries include cord bleeding, ocular injuries, fetal brain and cutaneous injuries, and deformities such as clubfoot. The risk of fetal injury increases with increasing number of puncture attempts.

Maternal and fetal blood cells may mix during an amniocentesis and, as a result, patients with rhesus (RhD) negative blood types carrying a RhD positive fetus are at risk of Rh sensitization. Rh sensitization is a process in which maternal antibodies form against red blood cell RhD antigens. In subsequent pregnancies with RhD positive fetuses, maternal presence of these antibodies can attack and destroy fetal red blood cells, a process called Rh isoimmunization that can result in a condition known as Rhesus disease or hemolytic disease of the fetus and newborn. Maternal blood type is assessed prior to undergoing amniocentesis and RhD immune globulin (RhoGam) is typically administered within 72 hours of the procedure to prevent maternal Rh sensitization in RhD negative patients that are non-sensitized to RhD antigens.

Amniotic fluid embolism, a condition in which amniotic fluid or other fetal debris enters the maternal circulation, is an extremely rare and catastrophic complication of amniocentesis. Amniotic fluid embolism can result in cardiovascular collapse and has a poor maternal prognosis. However, amniotic fluid embolism following amniocentesis has been reported infrequently in the literature in the last 60 years, mostly in the context of case-reports.

Chorioamnionitis and uterine and maternal skin infections are potential complications of amniocentesis that can occur as a result of bacterial introduction throughout the course of the procedure. The risk of amniocentesis-related chorioamnionitis and uterine infections is less than 0.1%. Performing the procedure using sterile techniques can help prevent infection.

Fetomaternal hemorrhage, or the entrance of fetal blood into the maternal circulation, is another complication of amniocentesis. It can result in anemia that can have consequences of varying severity. The procedure-related risk of fetomaternal hemorrhage attributable to amniocentesis is 2.6%.

Amniotic fluid cell culture after amniocentesis has a failure rate of 0.1%. Later gestational ages at the time of the procedure and amniotic fluid samples contaminated with blood increase the risk of amniocyte culture failure.

While recognizing the aforementioned risks, the American College of Obstetricians and Gynecologists recommend that prenatal screening, or diagnostic testing for aneuploidy via procedures like amniocentesis or chorionic villus sampling, be discussed with and offered to all patients regardless of maternal age or risk profile.

== Procedure and technique ==
An amniocentesis is typically performed in the second trimester between the 15th and 20th week of gestation; however, it can be done at any later gestational age. It is an outpatient procedure typically performed by an obstetrician-gynecologist with additional amniocentesis training.

Genetic counseling should be provided to the pregnant patient and informed consent should be obtained prior to the procedure.

Prior to the onset of the amniocentesis, the pregnant patient will undergo ultrasound evaluation to assess fetal viability and position, gestational age, amniotic fluid volume, maximum vertical pocket, umbilical cord insertion site, and any obvious fetal deformities. This information is utilized to determine the needle used and how the procedure should be performed. The fetus should be at least 15 weeks' gestation and the chorion and amnion should be fused.

Amniocentesis is a sterile procedure, therefore medical personnel performing and assisting with the procedure will scrub with antiseptic solution, use sterile gloves, clean the maternal abdomen with antiseptic solution, cover the ultrasound probe with a sterile cover, and use sterile ultrasound gel.

Ultrasound guidance is used continuously throughout the course of the procedure so that the needle is always visualized. A sterile 20–22 gauge spinal needle is firmly inserted perpendicular to the maternal abdomen. After puncturing the maternal abdomen, the operator punctures the uterus, gains access into amniotic cavity by puncturing the amniotic membrane while taking care not to cause membrane tenting, and proceeds to advance the needle into the amniotic cavity. The needle should be guided into the region of the maximum vertical pocket, where the single largest area of amniotic fluid devoid of fetal parts, umbilical cord, and placenta is available for sampling. Amniotic fluid is composed of fetal cells, urine, and lung secretions. 18-20 mL of amniotic fluid is slowly aspirated, with the first 1-2 mL typically discarded due to higher risk of maternal cell contamination. The remaining sample is submitted for laboratory testing. Fetal viability after the procedure should be confirmed by observing adequate fetal cardiac activity. The number of needle puncture attempts should be documented.

There is little scientific data supporting administration of prophylactic antibiotics prior to an amniocentesis and therefore, it is currently not recommended. Similarly, there is little scientific support for the placement of a local anesthetic prior to amniocentesis.

Maternal blood type is assessed prior to undergoing amniocentesis and RhD immune globulin (RhoGam) is typically administered within 72 hours of the procedure to prevent maternal isoimmunization in RhD negative patients that are non-sensitized to RhD antigens.

Amniocentesis technique differs in twin pregnancies and requires additional operator training. The two different approaches are the single-needle technique and two-needle insertion technique.

If used for prenatal genetic diagnosis, fetal cells may be separated by centrifugation from the extracted sample and grown in a culture medium in order to perform genetic tests. The types of tests performed on the sample will be determined by the patient's indications for undergoing amniocentesis. Fluorescent in-situ hybridization (FISH) and quantitative fluorescence polymerase chain reaction (QF-PCR) are two tests commonly performed on uncultured cells after amniocentesis, with results available within two days. These tests can accurately identify trisomy 13, trisomy 18, and trisomy 21. FISH is capable of providing a limited karyotype and, along with the aforementioned trisomies, can also detect aneuploidies in the X and Y sex chromosomes. Abnormal results from FISH studies should be confirmed with other cytogenetic testing, as false positives and negatives are possible Karyotypes are another common test performed on amniotic fluid to visualize chromosome number and characteristics, with a result turnaround of up to three weeks. Another test that may be performed is a chromosomal microarray, which can detect chromosomal imbalances, such as small- and large-scale deletions and duplications. Chromosomal microarray can be performed on cultured or uncultured fetal tissue, with results available as early as 3 days. The American College of Obstetricians and Gynecologist recommends that patients who choose to undergo invasive diagnostic testing have access to chromosomal microarray analysis.

== Recovery ==
After an amniocentesis, patients may resume their routine activity level while withholding from strenuous exercise. Some sources recommend house rest for the initial 24 hours after the procedure, though data supporting this recommendation is limited. Follow-up one week after the procedure is recommended to undergo ultrasound evaluation for fetal viability and assess healing of the puncture site. Post-procedural pain and discomfort should be minimal and temporary and may be managed with acetaminophen. Patients will be instructed to report to an emergency room if they experience vaginal bleeding or leakage of fluid, intense uterine pain, or a fever greater than 38 °C.

=== Immediate post-procedure care ===
Both the patient's and the fetus' vital signs are monitored immediately following the procedure in order to ensure stability in the fetus. Usually, the patients will be monitored for about an hour following the procedure. During this time, the patient will receive education surrounding recommendations for home care post-procedure. The provider will explain signs and symptoms of complications, such as heavy bleeding, cramping, fever, or decreased fetal movement. The provider may also administer a RhoGAM injection depending on the patient's and fetus' blood types to prevent reactions to differing Rh proteins.

=== Home care post-procedure ===
==== Common side effects ====
It is common for patients to experience mild cramping, abdominal pain, or pain at the insertion site. It is also common for patients to experience spotting or mild vaginal bleeding. Patients may feel fatigued and want to rest following the procedure.

==== Recommendations ====
Upon returning home from the procedure, it is recommended that the patient rests at home for 24 hours, avoiding strenuous activity such as exercising, running, heavy lifting, etcetera. It is also important to avoid sexual intercourse during this time. Practitioners often recommend acetaminophen, or Tylenol, to help alleviate any discomfort following the procedure. 650–1,000 mg every 4 hours is standard. Do not exceed 4,000 mg in 24 hours.

==== Mental health ====
It is not uncommon for patients to experience stress and anxiety following the procedure, especially while results are pending. Patients may practice self care during this time, and can reach out to family and friends for support.

=== Short term complications and adverse reactions ===
Though cramps and bleeding can be normal, it is important to monitor these symptoms. If cramps become more severe than a menstrual cramp, if you experience heavy bleeding, leaking of amniotic fluid, or start to spike a fever, contact your doctor. These signs or symptoms can be signs of fetal stress or injury, and should be investigated.

== History ==
Physicians have used the process of inserting a needle transabdominally into the uterus to extract amniotic fluid for the management of hydramnios, or excess amniotic fluid, as early as the late 1800s. In 1930, needle insertion into the amniotic sac was used to inject contrast dye for the purposes of amniography, or radiographic visualization of the fetal, placental, and uterine outlines. Beginning in the 1950s, amniocentesis was used to diagnose and determine the severity of Rhesus disease. In the mid-1950s, Fritz Fuchs and Povl Riis used fetal cells cultured from extracted amniotic fluid to determine fetal sex based on the presence of Barr Bodies. They postulated that this technique could provide information on the risk for X-linked disease in fetuses with carrier mothers. By the 1960s, this technology was being applied to X-linked conditions such as Duchenne muscular dystrophy and hemophilia. In 1966, M. W Steele and W. R Breg Jr. were able to culture amniocytes that could undergo karyotyping. Their work opened the door to the prenatal diagnosis of aneuploidies. In 1972, R. G. Sutcliffe and D. J. H. Brock found that higher amniotic alpha-fetoprotein levels were associated with neural tube defects.

In 1972, ultrasound-guided amniocenteses began replacing free-handed taps following J. Bang and A. Northeved's initiative to employ ultrasound technology to improve amniocentesis. Up until the 1980s, static B-scan ultrasound-guidance was used for the procedure, a process that did not permit visualization of the needle in the amniotic cavity.

Eventually, real-time ultrasound scanners improved the ultrasound-assisted amniocentesis. Given its prenatal diagnostic accuracy for a range of fetal conditions and its relative safety profile, amniocentesis has become the most common invasive fetal testing procedure.

== Society and culture ==
=== Prenatal sex discernment and sex-selective abortion ===
As stated in the history section, amniocentesis can be used to determine the sex of a fetus. This can be medically relevant in families that carry X-linked genetic conditions, since parents may want further genetic testing if the fetus is determined to be male (XY), and therefore has a higher likelihood of having the inherited disease. However, sex discernment is also used for social and cultural reasons. In some cultures, male children are more desirable than female children. This leads some parents to use amniocentesis and other forms of prenatal genetic testing (like chorionic villus sampling and preimplantation genetic diagnosis) to determine the sex of the child with the intent of terminating the pregnancy if the fetus is determined to have two X chromosomes. Sex-selective abortion is particularly common in countries such as China or India, among others. Sex-selective abortion is one of the causes for low child sex ratios in countries in Asia, Africa, and Eastern Europe. There are also significantly skewed child sex ratios in the Caucasus region. Naturally, the human sex ratio is approximately 105 males for every 100 females, and any significant deviations from these values is usually considered evidence for sex selective abortion.

India and China have made prenatal sex determination illegal in an effort to prevent sex-selective abortion. In India, this happened through the 1994 Pre-Conception and Pre-Natal Diagnostic Techniques (Prohibition Of Sex Selection) Act (PCPNDT Act). However, this has not necessarily affected the widespread practice of sex-selective abortion as abortion is generally legal, and this law has been inconsistently enforced. In China, the societal preference for male children was exacerbated by the historical one-child policy, where in many regions of China, parents were limited to having only one child. As with India, prenatal sex determination is banned in China but remains a widespread practice, with enforcement also proving to be difficult.

== See also ==
- Chorionic villus sampling
- Amniotic stem cells
- Elective genetic and genomic testing
- Percutaneous umbilical cord blood sampling
- Prenatal diagnosis
