= Transcervical =

Transcervical refers to a transluminal procedure through the cervix of the uterus, including:

- Transcervical sterilization
- Transcervical chorionic villus sampling
