= Genomic counseling =

Genomic counseling is the process by which a person gets informed about his or her genome often in the setting of elective genetic and genomic testing. In contrast to genetic counseling, which focuses on Mendelian diseases and typically involves person-to-person communication with a genetic counselor or other medical genetics expert, genomic counseling is not limited to currently clinically relevant information. It is often based on genomic information that is of interest for the informed person, such as increased risk for common complex disease that has actionable components (for example diabetes or obesity), genetically determined non-disease related traits (for example baldness), or recreational forms of information and genetic genealogy data. An individual's response to certain medications/drugs based on their pharmacogenomic profile may be provided.

The need for genomic counseling is currently driven by personal genomics companies, including 23andMe, Helix, and Pathway Genomics. Given the wealth and complexity of information obtained by personal genomics tests, genomic counseling can require expertise from a wide range of experts, including physicians, geneticists, molecular biologists, evolutionary biologists, population geneticists, statisticians, or bioinformaticians. Access of consumers to complete personal genomes through cheap full genome sequencing is likely to exacerbate this problem in the near future. There are currently not enough genetic counselors and clinical geneticists to help patients interpret whole-genome sequencing results regarding health-relevant information, and research shows that primary-care physicians lack the knowledge and expertise to help patients understand even single-gene test results.

== Risk assessments ==
Typically, a family history is taken to more fully allow interpretation and incorporation of genomic data. Such an assessment is used to "identify and quantify" risk for inherited hereditary diseases. Whole genome sequencing and whole exome sequencing [WES] "may not provide full coverage of critical genes" and performing a risk assessment "allows the genetic team to generate a differential diagnosis and order more sensitive genetic testing if necessary".

== Education and informed consent ==
"Whole genomes have gone from becoming that discovery technique to being present in the clinic on a regular basis". Genomic counseling sessions may include briefings on "general genetic principles, modes of inheritance, family/individual specific risk assessment, an in-depth discussion of the diagnosis and natural history, potential testing options, and case management for the condition occurring… or for which they are at risk". The delivery of such information should be aimed to the patient's level of comprehension and take into account his or her culture and other personal context.

== Interpretation of genetic tests ==
Challenges in genetic counseling exists in both the decision and discussion of which incidental findings will be assessed and returned to patients. Patients may not be familiar with the condition and may be unable to make an informed opinion regarding the next steps in treatment. Genetic counselors and geneticists "already sit on interpretation panels for determining what warrants disclosure". This role will become "increasingly relevant for all genetic counselors" in order to ensure that all in the profession are "proficient in variant interpretation and understand the laboratory and bioinformatics processes" of such tests.

== Genomic counselors ==
Qualifications for who can practice genomic counseling and what the practice will entail is up for debate as genetic counseling begins to incorporate genome counseling. A few changes that may see changes include the roles of risk assessments, education, and informed consent.

== Virtual genomic counseling ==
Telegenetics is "videoconferencing for clinical genetics services" and is becoming an "increasingly utilized method of delivering genetic counseling to rural areas".

=== Benefits ===
Direct to consumer genetic testing (DTC GT) frequently utilizes telegenetics regardless of the client's "geographical location or ability to attend face-to-face sessions".

There has been very limited study of patients receiving potentially actionable genomic based results or the utilization of genetic counselors in the online result delivery process. A randomized controlled trial on 199 patients with chronic disease each receiving eight personalized and actionable complex disease reports online. Primary study aims were to assess the impact of in-person genomic counseling on 1) causal attribution of disease risk, 2) personal awareness of disease risk, and 3) perceived risk of developing a particular disease. Of 98 intervention arm participants (mean age = 57.8; 39% female) randomized for in-person genomic counseling, 76 (78%) were seen. In contrast, control arm participants (n = 101; mean age = 58.5; 54% female) were initially not offered genomic counseling as part of the study protocol but were able to access in-person genomic counseling, if they requested it, 3-months post viewing of at least one test report and post-completion of the study-specific follow-up survey. A total of 64 intervention arm and 59 control arm participants completed follow-up survey measures. We found that participants receiving in-person genomic counseling had enhanced objective understanding of the genetic variant risk contribution for multiple complex diseases. Genomic counseling was associated with lowered participant causal beliefs in genetic influence across all eight diseases, compared to control participants. Our findings also illustrate that for the majority of diseases under study, intervention arm participants believed they knew their genetic risk status better than control arm subjects. Disease risk was modified for the majority during genomic counseling, due to the assessment of more comprehensive family history. In conclusion, for patients receiving personalized and actionable genomic results through a web portal, genomic counseling enhanced their objective understanding of the genetic variant risk contribution to multiple common diseases. These results support the development of additional genomic counseling interventions to ensure a high level of patient comprehension and improve patient-centered health outcomes.

=== Licensure as barrier ===
Licensure poses a conflict for the provision of virtual genomic counseling. Medical practitioners are typically licensed to practice in the state in which they reside. In order to practice across state borders, the practitioner must apply for licensure in that state as well. Obtaining multiple licenses is costly and time-consuming for practitioners who often don't want to deal with the hoops required to become duly licensed. Providers that do offer telemedicine or telegenetics services to out-of-state clients face "civil and criminal sanctions for practicing medicine without a license". Due to the limitation that licensure poses, clients who require the service of medical geneticists but live in a state with no licensed practitioners are required to travel to nearby states or go without the service.
