= Confined placental mosaicism =

Confined placental mosaicism (CPM) represents a discrepancy between the chromosomal makeup of the cells in the placenta and the cells in the fetus. CPM was first described by Kalousek and Dill in 1983. CPM is diagnosed when some trisomic cells are detected on chorionic villus sampling and only normal cells are found on a subsequent prenatal test, such as amniocentesis or fetal blood sampling. In theory, CPM is when the trisomic cells are found only in the placenta. CPM is detected in approximately 1-2% of ongoing pregnancies that are studied by chorionic villus sampling (CVS) at 10 to 12 weeks of pregnancy. Chorionic villus sampling is a prenatal procedure which involves a placental biopsy. Most commonly when CPM is found it represents a trisomic cell line in the placenta and a normal diploid chromosome complement in the baby. However, the fetus is involved in about 10% of cases.

== Pathogenesis ==
CPM occurs in one of two ways:

- Mitotic CPM - Mitotic non-disjunction can occur in a trophoblast cell or a non-fetal cell from the inner cell mass creating a trisomic cell line in the tissue which is destined to become the placental mesoderm.
- Meiotic CPM - Alternatively, CPM can occur through the mechanism of trisomic rescue. If a trisomic conception undergoes trisomic rescue in certain cells, including those that are destined to become the baby, then the remaining trisomy cells may be confined to the placenta.

Several factors influence the pattern of normal and abnormal cells in the developing embryo. Reduced or improved replication rates of the trisomic cells could affect the number of abnormal cells compared to the number of normal cells. The abnormal cells may fail to differentiate or function properly and could be lost. It is also possible that there is no selection against the abnormal cells, but their presence could compromise the pregnancy on a whole.

== Types ==
There are three types of confined placental mosaicism depending on the cells involved at the time of the error:

- Type 1 CPM– The error occurs in a trophoblast cell, and thus only trophoblast cells are affected. This type of mosaicism is most often associated with normal pregnancy outcome.
- Type 2 CPM– The error occurs in a non-fetal cell of the inner cell mass. This trisomy is confined to the chorionic villus stroma. This type of mosaicism is described in normal pregnancies and is sometimes associated with delayed growth of the fetus.
- Type 3 CPM– Trisomic cells are seen in trophoblast cells and the villus stroma, but are absent in the embryo. This type of mosaicism is more commonly associated with delayed growth in the fetus.

== Prognosis ==
Most pregnancies that are diagnosed with confined placental mosaicism continue to term with no complications and the children develop normally.

However, some pregnancies with CPM experience prenatal or perinatal complications. The pregnancy loss rate in pregnancies with confined placental mosaicism, diagnosed by chorionic villus sampling, is higher than among pregnancies without placental mosaicism. It may be that sometimes the presence of significant numbers of abnormal cells in the placenta interferes with proper placental function. An impaired placenta cannot support the pregnancy and this may lead to the loss of a chromosomally normal baby. On the other hand, an apparently normal diploid fetus may experience problems with growth or development due to the effects of uniparental disomy (UPD). Intrauterine growth restriction (IUGR) has been reported in a number of CPM cases. In follow-up studies adequate postnatal catch-up growth has been demonstrated, which may suggest a placental cause of the IUGR.

When predicting the likely effects (if any) of CPM detected in the first trimester, several potentially interactive factors may be playing a role, including:

- Origin of error: Somatic errors are associated with lower levels of trisomy in the placenta and are expected usually to involve only one cell line (i.e.: the trophoblast cells or the villus stroma cells). Somatic errors are thus less likely than meiotic errors to be associated with either ultrasound abnormalities, growth problems or detectable levels of trisomy in small samples of prenatal CVS. Currently, there is no evidence that somatic errors, which lead to confined placental trisomy, are of any clinical consequence. Errors of meiotic origin are correlated with higher levels of trisomy in placental tissues and may be associated with adverse pregnancy outcome. The cell type in which the abnormality is seen is also an important factor in determining the risk of fetal involvement. The villus stroma or mesenchymal core is more likely than the cytotrophoblast to be reflective of the fetal genotype.
- Level of mosaicism: There is a correlation between a high number of aneuploid cells detected at CVS with poor pregnancy progress. This includes an association between high levels of abnormal cells in placental tissue and concerns with the growth of the baby. However, it is not accurate to use these associations to try to predict pregnancy outcome based on the percent of trisomic cells in a first trimester CVS result.
- Specific chromosomes: The influence of CPM on fetal growth is chromosome specific. Certain chromosomes carry imprinted genes involved in growth or placental function, which may contribute to impaired pregnancy progress when CPM is detected. Different chromosomes are observed at different frequencies depending on the type of CPM observed. The pregnancy outcome is strongly chromosome specific. The most frequently seen trisomic cells in confined placental mosaicism involve chromosomes 2, 3, 7, 8 and 16. The next frequently involved are 9, 13, 15, 18, 20 and 22. It has been observed that CPM involving the sex chromosomes usually has no adverse effects on fetal development. The common autosomal trisomies (21, 18, 13) made up a smaller number of cases of mosaicism detected on CVS, but were more often confirmed in fetal tissue (19%). On the other hand, the uncommon autosomal trisomies accounted for a greater number of placental mosaicism cases, but were less often confirmed in fetal tissue (3.2%). When CPM is detected on CVS involving certain chromosomes which are known or suspected to carry imprinted genes, molecular investigations should be performed to exclude fetal UPD. We will explore chromosome specific cases in the chromosome specific section.
- Type of chromosome abnormality: The factor that had the highest predictive value as to whether the fetus was affected or not was the type of chromosome abnormality. Marker chromosomes were more often confirmed in the fetus than trisomies. For example, of 28 cases of mosaic polyploidy detected on CVS, fetal mosaicism was confirmed in only one case. This is compared to marker chromosomes detected on CVS, in which mosaicism was confirmed in 1/4 of the fetuses.

== Molecular mechanisms and diagnosis ==
Confined placental mosaicism (CPM) results from postzygotic mutations that create genetically distinct placental cell lineages absent in the fetus. While traditionally linked to chromosomal abnormalities, recent genomic studies show that CPM also involves smaller sequence variants.

A 2025 Nature Communications study by Miceikaite et al. used deep whole-genome sequencing of early human placentas and revealed extensive genetic heterogeneity, with distinct clonal expansions and postzygotic mutations appearing even in first-trimester samples. These findings suggest that CPM is a dynamic feature of placental development rather than a rare chromosomal event.

Because placental biopsies may contain non-fetal variants, confirmatory testing using amniotic fluid remains essential when CPM is suspected.
