= Hans Ferdinand Linskens =

German botanist and geneticist (1921–2007)

- Born: 22 May 1921; Lahr, Germany
- Died: 13 August 2007 (aged 86)
- Known for: Editor-in-chief of Theoretical and Applied Genetics
- Scientific career
- Fields: Botany and genetics
- Institutions: Radboud University Nijmegen

Hans Ferdinand Linskens (22 May 1921 – 13 August 2007) was a German botanist and geneticist. Linskens was born in Lahr, Germany. From 1957 to 1986, he was professor of botany at the Radboud University Nijmegen. Linskens was the editor-in-chief of Theoretical and Applied Genetics (1977 to 1987) and Sexual Plant Reproduction. He was also an influential editor of handbooks.

Linskens was an elected member of the Deutsche Akademie der Naturforscher Leopoldina, Linnean Society of London, Koninklijke Nederlandse Akademie van Wetenschappen in 1978, and the Academie Royale des Sciences de Belgique.
