= Amniotic stem cell bank =

Facility that stores stem cells derived from amniotic fluid for future use

An amniotic stem cell bank is a facility that stores stem cells derived from amniotic fluid for future use. Stem cell samples in private (or family) banks are stored specifically for use by the individual person from whom such cells have been collected and the banking costs are paid by such person. The sample can later be retrieved only by that individual and for the use by such individual or, in many cases, by her or his first-degree blood relatives. In case of amniotic fluid stem cell banking, the mother providing the donation initially has ownership of the stem cells and financial responsibility for its storage. When the child from that pregnancy reaches legal age, the ownership and responsibility for the sample may be transferred. The first private amniotic stem cell bank in the US was opened by Bio cell Center in October 2009 in Medford, Massachusetts.

== Collection process ==
Amniotic stem cells are collected from amniotic fluid extracted during a genetic amniocentesis, a prenatal diagnosis procedure typically performed during the 2nd trimester of pregnancy. For the purpose of stem cell preservation, a small amount of the fluid withdrawn for genetic analysis is saved in a collection container for transport to a processing and storage facility. Collection of the sample causes no change to the standard amniocentesis procedure and therefore adds no additional risk to the mother. In the United States, the Food and Drug Administration regulates amniotic stem cells under the category of “Human Cells, Tissues, and Cellular and Tissue Based-Products.”

== Cryopreservation ==
After the collection, the amniotic fluid sample containing the stem cells is shipped to a lab for processing, cryopreservation and storage. The processed sample is exposed to a gradual freezing process which is important because it keeps the cells alive during the cryopreservation process. After freezing, the sample is transferred to a liquid nitrogen storage tank. The protocols used for the cryopreservation process have largely been adapted from those originally designed for bone marrow haematopoietic stem cells.

== Stem cells and regenerative medicine ==
Regenerative medicine is a field of medical research developing treatments to repair or re-grow specific tissue in the body. Because a person’s own (autologous) amniotic stem cells can be safely infused back into that individual without being rejected by the body’s immune system - and because they have unique characteristics compared to other sources of stem cells - they are an increasing focus of regenerative medicine research. Research in this area has the potential to revolutionize medicine. It is advancing so rapidly that it is even difficult for medical professionals to supply the most up-to-date information for their patients. Possible future uses in the field of regenerative medicine include repairing heart tissue, birth defects, and other damaged tissues.

== See also ==
- Cell bank
- cord blood bank
