= Jehannine Austin =

British-Canadian researcher

- Born: Jehannine Claire Austin; London, England

Academic background
- Education: University of Bath (BSc); University of Wales College of Medicine (PhD); University of British Columbia (MSc)
- Thesis: Optimisation of DHPLC and the study of Candidate Genes for Schizophrenia

Jehannine Claire Austin FCAHS is a British and Canadian neuropsychiatric geneticist and a genetic counselor. They are a professor at the University of British Columbia and Executive Director of the Provincial Health Services Authority's BC Mental Health and Substance Use Services Research Institute. In 2012, Austin founded the world’s first specialist psychiatric genetic counselling service.

== Early life and education ==
Austin was born in London, England but raised in Swansea, Wales. They graduated from Bishop Gore School in 1993 and enrolled at the University of Bath. Following their undergraduate degree, Austin completed their PhD in neuropsychiatric genetics from the University of Wales College of Medicine. They then travelled to North America to complete their Master of Science degree in genetic counselling at the University of British Columbia (UBC).

== Career ==
Following their training, Austin became an assistant professor of psychiatry at UBC in 2007. During their early tenure at UBC, Austin received the Canadian Institutes of Health Research (CIHR) New Investigator Award and a Scholar Award from the Michael Smith Health Research BC Foundation. In 2010, Austin was appointed a Tier 2 Canada Research Chair in Translational Psychiatric Genetics to assist in their research for developing new counseling-based treatments and biologically based treatments for people with mental illness and their families. One of their first actions as a CRC involved creating the world’s first specialist psychiatric genetic counselling service (Adapt Clinic). Within the first year of the program, Austin co-counselled over 250 people. They also received the inaugural Psychiatry Research Award from Pfizer Canada to support their "research into the effect of genetic counseling on adherence to psychotropic medication in serious mental illness." By 2014, their program provided services to over 300 families across British Columbia and branched out into the United States and the United Kingdom. As such, Austin received the 2013 International Leadership Award and became the first non-American president of the National Society of Genetic Counselors.

In July 2016, Austin was appointed the Acting Head of UBC's Department of Psychiatry until December 31, 2016. While serving in this role, Austin was one of seven UBC faculty members named a Fellow of the Royal Society of Canada's College of New Scholars, Artists and Scientists. They were specifically recognized for "pioneering genetic counseling research, showing that genetic counseling has meaningful benefits for people with psychiatric disorders and their families." Upon stepping down as Acting Head of UBC's Department of Psychiatry, Austin was appointed the Executive Director of the Provincial Health Services Authority's BC Mental Health and Substance Use Services Research Institute. In this role, Austin oversees mental health and substance use professionals across the province and focuses on many different facets of mental health and substance use beyond genetic counselling. Their efforts into "influencing health services worldwide " were recognized in 2017 with an election to the Canadian Academy of Health Sciences.

In 2019, Austin was featured in a documentary about former Labour Party member Alastair Campbell. In the documentary, Campbell spoke openly about his depression with Austin, who used a "jam jar" analogy to explain how genetic and environmental factors influence mental illnesses. They also received the 2019 Dr. Samarthji Lal Award for Mental Health Research for their work in genetic counselling. During the COVID-19 pandemic, Austin was the co principal investigator on a study entitled "Impact of social determinants of mental health on child and parent risk, resilience and support access in the COVID-19 era: A nested mixed-methods study of short and long-term outcomes."

== Selected publications ==
- How to Talk with Families About Genetics and Psychiatric Illness (2011)
