= Povl Riis =

Danish gastroenterologist (1925–2017)

Professor Povl Riis FRCP
- Born: 28 December 1925
- Died: 2 January 2017 (aged 91)
- Education: University of Copenhagen
- Occupation: Gastroenterologist
- Employer: University of Copenhagen

Povl Riis FRCP (1925-2017) was a Danish gastroenterologist.

== Biography ==
Riis was born on 28 December 1925.

In 1956 he used, for the first time, amniocentesis to make an antenatal diagnosis of genetic disease.

Riis also served as chair of National Research Ethics Committee of Denmark, from its creation in 1979, until 1998. He wrote the second version of the Helsinki Declaration of Human Research in 1975 with Prof. Bloomquist (Sweden) and Prof. Engers (Norway). He is also a founding member of Vancouver Group of Medical Editors.

Riis received his M.D. from the University of Copenhagen in 1952 and DM Sci in 1959. He served there as a professor of medicine from 1974-96. He was physician-in-chief of the medical department of the Gentofte Hospital, Copenhagen from 1963 to 1976, and physician-in-chief for gastroenterology at the Herlev University Hospital, Copenhagen, from 1976 to 1996.

He was also vice president of the European Science Foundation from 1974–77 and the Chairman of the Danish Medical Research Council from 1972-77.

He was editor-in-chief of the Journal of the Danish Medical Association from 1957 to 1991.

He served on the Journal of the American Medical Association's editorial board from 1994; and as chair of the Nordic Cooperative Board for Medical Science from 1970 to 1972; of the Danish National Sciences Ethical Committee for Medicine from 1979–98; and of the Age Forum from 1996.

He died on 2 January 2017.
