= Lamellar body count =

Test for assessing fetal lung maturity

- Purpose: assess fetal maturity

The lamellar body count is a test for assessing fetal lung maturity.
