= Surfactant–albumin ratio =

Medical test

The surfactant–albumin ratio is a test for assessing fetal lung maturity. The test, though no longer commercially available, used an automatic analyzer to measure the polarized fluorescent light emitted from a sample of amniotic fluid that had been challenged with a fluorescent probe that interacted competitively with both lecithin (phosphatidylcholine) and albumin in such a way that direct quantitative measurements of both substances could be attained. Higher amounts of lecithin – in reference to albumin – is indicative of lung maturity (and thus survival of the baby). When this test was still used in practice, the Standards of Laboratory Practice set the threshold for lung maturity at 55 mg of lecithin per gram of albumin.
