= Genetic counseling =

Advising those affected by or at risk of genetic disorders

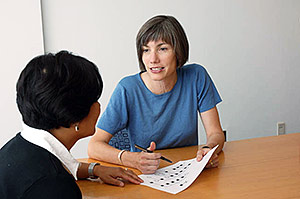
A genetic counsellor discussing a pedigree with a client

Genetic counseling is the process of investigating individuals and families affected by or at risk of genetic disorders to help them understand and adapt to the medical, psychological and familial implications of genetic contributions to disease. This field is considered necessary for the implementation of genomic medicine. The process integrates:

- Interpretation of family and medical histories to assess the chance of disease occurrence or recurrence
- Education about inheritance, testing, management, prevention, resources
- Counseling to promote informed choices, adaptation to the risk or condition and support in reaching out to relatives that are also at risk

== History ==
The practice of advising people about inherited traits began around the turn of the 20th century, shortly after William Bateson suggested that the new medical and biological study of heredity be called "genetics". Heredity became intertwined with social reforms when the field of modern eugenics took form. Although initially well-intentioned, ultimately the movement had disastrous consequences; many states in the United States had laws mandating the sterilization of certain individuals, others were not allowed to immigrate and by the 1930s these ideas were accepted by many other countries including in Germany where euthanasia for the "genetically defective" was legalized in 1939. This part of the history of genetics is at the heart of the now "non directive" approach to genetic counseling.

Sheldon Clark Reed coined the term genetic counseling in 1947 and published the book Counseling in Medical Genetics in 1955. Most of the early genetic counseling clinics were run by non-medical scientists or by those who were not experienced clinicians. With the growth in knowledge of genetic disorders and the appearance of medical genetics as a distinct specialty in the 1960s, genetic counseling progressively became medicalized, representing one of the key components of clinical genetics. It was not, though, until later that the importance of a firm psychological basis was recognized and became an essential part of genetic counseling, the writings of Seymour Kessler making a particular contribution to this. The first master's degree genetic counseling program was founded in 1969 at Sarah Lawrence College in Bronxville, New York. In 1979, the National Society of Genetic Counselors (NSGC) was founded and led by the first president, Audrey Heimler.

== Detection and early processes ==
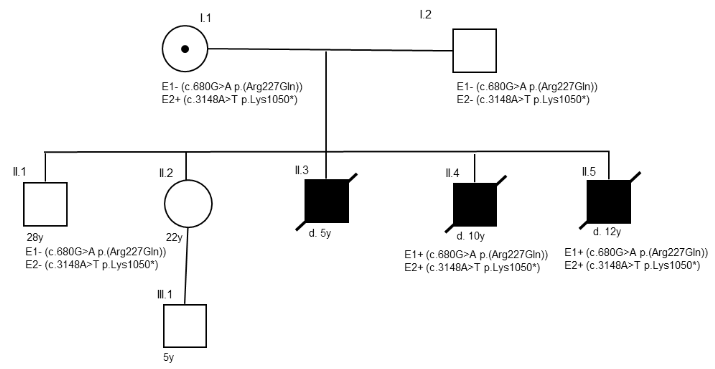
Knowing which family members have inherited genetic variants is key to assessing individual and reproductive risk in genetic counselling.

Diagnostic testing occurs when an individual is showing signs or symptoms associated with a specific condition. Genetic testing can be used to arrive at a definitive diagnosis in order to provide better prognosis as well as medical management or treatment options. Testing can reveal conditions can be mild or asymptomatic with early treatment, as opposed to debilitating without treatment (such as phenylketonuria). Genetic tests are available for a number of genetic conditions, including but not limited to: Down syndrome, sickle cell disease, Tay–Sachs disease, muscular dystrophy. Establishing a genetic diagnosis can provide information to other at-risk individuals in the family.

Any reproductive risks (e.g. a chance to have a child with the same diagnosis) can also be explored after a diagnosis. Many disorders cannot occur unless both the mother and father pass on their genes, such as cystic fibrosis; this is known as autosomal recessive inheritance. Other autosomal dominant diseases can be inherited from one parent, such as Huntington disease and DiGeorge syndrome. Yet other genetic disorders are caused by an error or mutation occurring during the cell division process (e.g. aneuploidy) and are usually not inherited.

Screening tests are often used prior to diagnostic testing, designed to separate people according to a fixed characteristic or property, with the intention of detecting early evidence of disease. For example, if a screening test during a pregnancy (such as maternal blood screening or ultrasound) reveals a risk of a health issue or genetic condition, patients are encouraged to receive genetic counseling to learn additional information regarding the suspected condition. A discussion of the management, therapy and treatments available for the conditions may take place; the next step may differ depending on the severity of the condition and range from during pregnancy to after delivery. Patients may decline additional screening and testing, elect to proceed to diagnostic testing, or pursue further screening tests to refine the risk during the pregnancy.

Presymptomatic or predictive testing occurs when an individual knows of a specific diagnosis (typically adult onset) in their family and has other affected relatives, but they themselves do not manifest any clinical findings at the time when they seek testing. The decision about whether or not to proceed with presymptomatic testing should entail a thoughtful approach and consideration of various medical, reproductive, social, insurance, and financial factors, with no "right" or "wrong" answer. Availability of treatment and medical management options for each specific diagnosis, as well as the genetics and inheritance pattern of the particular condition should be reviewed as inherited conditions can have reduced penetrance.

Insurance and legal issues should also be discussed during genetic counseling. There are laws in the United States such as GINA (Genetic Information Non-discrimination Act) and ACA that provide certain protections against discrimination for individuals with genetic diagnoses.

== Approach and session overview ==
=== Approach ===
There are different approaches to genetic counseling. The reciprocal-engagement model of genetic counseling practice includes tenets, goals, strategies, and behaviors for addressing patients' genetic concerns. Some counselors favor a psycho-educational approach while others incorporate more psycho-therapeutic techniques. Genetic counseling is psycho-educational as patients "learn how genetics contributes to their health risks and then process what this means and how it feels".

Whether the process of genetic counseling is a form of psychotherapy is up for debate. The relationship between the client and counselor is similar as are the goals of the sessions. As a psychotherapist aims to help his client improve his wellbeing, a genetic counselor also helps his client to address a "situational health threat that similarly threatens client wellbeing". Due to the lack of studies which compare genetic counseling to the practice of psychotherapy, it is hard to say with certainty whether genetic counseling can be "conceptualized as a short-term, applied, specific type of psychotherapy". However, there few existing studies suggest that genetic counseling falls "significantly short of psychotherapeutic counseling" because genetic counseling sessions primarily consist of the distribution of information without much emphasis placed on explaining any long-term impacts to the client.

=== Structure ===
The goals of genetic counseling are to increase understanding of genetic diseases, discuss disease management options and explain the risks and benefits of testing. Counseling sessions focus on giving vital, unbiased information and non-directive assistance in the patient's decision-making process. Seymour Kessler, in 1979, first categorized sessions in five phases: an intake phase, an initial contact phase, the encounter phase, the summary phase, and a follow-up phase. The intake and follow-up phases occur outside of the actual counseling session. The initial contact phase is when the counselor and families meet and build rapport. The encounter phase includes dialogue between the counselor and the client about the nature of screening and diagnostic tests. The summary phase provides all the options and decisions available for the next step. If patients wish to go ahead with testing, an appointment is organized and the genetic counselor acts as the person to communicate the results. Result delivery can happen both in person or via phone. Often counselors will call out results to avoid patients having to come back in as results can take weeks to be processed. If further counseling is needed in a more personal setting, or it is determined that additional family members should be tested, a secondary appointment can be made.

=== Support ===
Genetic counselors provide supportive counseling to families, serve as patient advocates and refer individuals and families to community or state support services. They serve as educators and resource people for other health care professionals and for the general public. Many engage in research activities related to the field of medical genetics and genetic counseling. When communicating increased risk, counselors anticipate the likely distress and prepare patients for the results. Counselors help clients cope with and adapt to the emotional, psychological, medical, social, and economic consequences of the test results.

Each individual considers their family needs, social setting, cultural background, and religious beliefs when interpreting their risk. Clients must evaluate their reasoning to continue with testing at all. Counselors are present to put all the possibilities in perspective and encourage clients to take time to think about their decision. When a risk is found, counselors frequently reassure parents that they were not responsible for the result. An informed choice without pressure or coercion is made when all relevant information has been given and understood.

After counseling for other hereditary conditions, the patient may be presented with the option of having genetic testing. In some circumstances no genetic testing is indicated, other times it may be useful to begin the testing process with an affected family member. The genetic counselor also reviews the advantages and disadvantages of genetic testing with the patient.

=== Outcomes ===
The most commonly measured genetic counseling outcomes included knowledge, anxiety or distress, satisfaction, perceived risk, genetic testing (intentions or receipt), health behaviors, and decisional conflict. Results suggest that genetic counseling can lead to increased knowledge, perceived personal control, positive health behaviors, and improved risk perception accuracy as well as decreases in anxiety, cancer-related worry, and decisional conflict.

== Sub-specialties ==
=== Adult genetics ===
Adult or general genetics clinics serve patients who are diagnosed with genetic conditions that begin to show signs or symptoms in adulthood. Many genetic conditions have varying ages of onset, ranging from an infantile form to an adult form. Genetic counseling can facilitate the decision-making process by providing the patient/family with education about the genetic condition as well as the medical management options available to individuals at risk of developing the condition. Having the genetic information of other members of the family opens the door to asking important questions about the pattern of inheritance of specific disease‐causing mutations. Whilst there is a wealth of literature that describes how families communicate information surrounding single genes, there is very little which explores the experience of communication about family genomes. Adult-onset disorders may overlap multiple specialties.

=== ART/Infertility genetics ===
Genetic counseling is an integral part of the process for patients utilizing preimplantation genetic testing (PGT), formerly called preimplantation genetic diagnosis. There are three types of PGT and all require in vitro fertilization (IVF) using assisted reproductive technology (ART). PGT-M, for monogenic disorders, involves testing embryos for a specific condition before it is implanted into the mother. This technique is currently being done for disorders with childhood onset, such as Cystic Fibrosis, Tay-Sachs and Muscular Dystrophy, as well as adult-onset conditions, including Huntington's Disease, Hereditary Breast and Ovarian Cancer Syndrome, and Lynch Syndrome. PGT-SR, for structural rearrangements, involves testing embryos to establish a pregnancy unaffected by a structural chromosomal abnormality (translocation). PGT-A, for aneuploidy, was formerly called preimplantation genetic screening, and involved testing embryos to identify any de novo aneuploidy. The indications to carry out PGT-A are: previous aneuploidy in the couple, implantation failure, recurrent miscarriage, severe male factor or advanced maternal age. Finally, PGT seems to be: safe for the embryo, trustable in the diagnosis, more efficient from the reproductive point of view and cost-effective.

Genetic counseling can also involve medical evaluation and clinical work-up for couples with infertility or recurrent pregnancy loss, as these histories can be associated with parental chromosome aberrations (such as inversions or translocations) and other genetic conditions.

=== Cardiovascular genetics ===
A rapidly expanding field in genetic counseling is cardiovascular genetics. More than 1 in 200 people have an inherited cardiovascular disease. Hereditary cardiac conditions range from common diseases, such as high cholesterol and coronary artery disease, to rare diseases like Long QT Syndrome, hypertrophic cardiomyopathy, and vascular diseases. Genetic counselors who specialize in cardiovascular disease have developed skills specific to the management of and counseling for genetic cardiovascular disorders and practice in both the pediatric and adult setting. Cardiovascular genetic counselors are also integral in local and national efforts to prevent sudden cardiac death, which is the leading cause of sudden death in young people. This is done by identifying patients with known or suspected heritable cardiovascular diseases and promoting cascade family screening or testing of at-risk relatives.

Common referral reasons include:

- Cardiomyopathy, including, hypertrophic cardiomyopathy and familial idiopathic dilated cardiomyopathy
- Arrhythmia, including Long QT syndrome and Brugada syndrome
- Vascular disease, including Marfan syndrome and aortic aneurysm and/or dissection (<50 years old)
- Congenital heart defects (e.g. conotruncal defects, left ventricular outflow tract defects)
- Familial hypercholesterolemia
- Family history of unexplained sudden death

Guidelines on cardiovascular genetics are published by multiple professional societies.

A genetic counsellor specialising in hereditary cancer meets with a client

=== Hereditary cancer genetics ===
Cancer genetic counselors see individuals with a personal diagnosis or family history of cancer or symptoms of an inherited cancer syndrome. Genetic counselors take a family history and assess for hereditary risk, or risk that can be passed down from generation to generation. If indicated, they can coordinate genetic testing, typically via blood or saliva sample, to evaluate for hereditary cancer risk. Personalized medical management and cancer screening recommendations can be provided based on results of genetic testing or the family history of cancer. While most cancers are sporadic (not inherited), some are more likely to have a hereditary factor, particularly when occurring at young ages or when clustering in families. These include common cancers such as breast, ovarian, colon and uterine cancers, as well as rare tumor types. General referral indications can include, but are not limited to:

- Personal or family history of cancer with unusually young age of onset (e.g. breast cancer under age 45, colon cancer under age 50)
- Diagnosis of a tumor or cancer with a high likelihood to be hereditary (e.g. male breast cancer, triple negative breast cancer, ovarian cancer, metastatic or high-grade prostate cancer, pancreatic cancer, retinoblastoma, adrenocortical carcinoma, pleuropulmonary blastoma, neuroendocrine tumor, medullary thyroid cancer, pheochromocytoma or paraganglioma)
- Personal or family history of bilateral cancers (e.g., both breasts or both kidneys) or multiple primary tumors in one person
- Features associated with an inherited cancer syndrome (e.g. more than 10 adenomatous polyps, rare types of gastrointestinal polyps, such as hamartomatous polyps), or specific skin findings like café au lait macules or freckling on the lips
- Family history of related cancers clustered on the same side of the family (e.g. breast/ovarian, colon/uterine, sarcoma/leukemia/brain)
- Family history of a known inherited cancer syndrome (e.g. hereditary breast and ovarian cancer syndrome, hereditary non-polyposis colorectal cancer, Li-Fraumeni syndrome)
- Individuals of Ashkenazi Jewish ancestry with a personal or family history of breast, ovarian, or pancreatic cancer
- Possible germline (inherited) genetic mutation suggested by tumor profile testing

=== Neurogenetics ===
Genetic counselors specializing in neurogenetics are involved in the care of individuals who have or are at risk to develop conditions affecting the central nervous system (brain and spinal cord) or peripheral nervous system (the nerves that leave the spinal cord and go to other places in the body, such as the feet and hands, skeletal muscles, and internal organs). Effects of these conditions can lead to various impairments some examples of which include cognitive decline, intellectual disability, seizures, uncontrolled movements (e.g. ataxia, chorea), muscle weakness, paralysis, or atrophy. Examples of neurogenetic disorders include:

- Brain malformation syndromes, including lissencephaly and polymicrogyria
- Brain tumor predisposition syndromes, including Neurofibromatosis 1 and 2
- Epilepsy (seizures)
- Hereditary motor neuron diseases, including amyotrophic lateral sclerosis (ALS/Lou Gehrig's disease) and spinal muscular atrophy
- Hereditary neuropathies, including Charcot-Marie-Tooth disease
- Intellectual disabilities, developmental delays, and autism spectrum disorder
- Leukodystrophy (hereditary white matter diseases)
- Memory and other cognitive disorders, including Alzheimer disease and frontotemporal dementia
- Movement disorders, including hereditary ataxia, spastic paraplegia, Huntington disease, and Parkinson disease
- Neuromuscular disorders, including muscular dystrophies, congenital myopathies, and congenital myasthenic syndromes

A baby may be examined by a clinical geneticist as part of pediatric genetic counselling

=== Pediatric genetics ===
Pediatric genetic counseling can be indicated for newborns, infants, children and their families. General referral indications can include:

- Birth defect(s) or multiple congenital anomalies (cleft lip/palate, heart defects, spina bifida)
- Intellectual disability of unknown cause, learning disabilities, or autism
- Sensory impairments (vision, hearing)
- Metabolic disorders (PKU, galactosemia, inborn errors of metabolism)
- Known/Suspected genetic disorders (e.g., Down syndrome, Cystic Fibrosis, Muscular Dystrophy)
- Primary immunodeficiency

=== Prenatal genetics ===
Prenatal genetics involves services for women either during or prior to a pregnancy.

General indications for referral to genetic counseling in the preconception or prenatal setting may include, but are not limited to:

- Advanced maternal age (35 years old or older at time of delivery)
- Advanced paternal age
- Current pregnancy with anomalies identified by ultrasound (e.g. increased nuchal translucency measurements)
- Current pregnancy with an abnormal genetic screening test or test result
- Current pregnancy with risk of or concern for maternal exposures, such as medications, radiation, drugs/alcohol, or infections
- Consanguineous union (cousins or otherwise blood related)
- Family history of an inherited genetic condition or chromosome abnormality
- Genetic carrier screening for recessive and/or X-linked diseases
- History of a previous child with a birth defect, developmental delay, or other genetic condition
- History of infertility, multiple unexplained miscarriages or cases of unexplained infant deaths
- Molecular test for single gene disorder

Prenatal genetic counseling may help with the decision-making process by walking patients through examples of what some people might do in similar situations, and their rationale for choosing that option. Decisions made by patients are affected by factors including timing, accuracy of information provided by tests, and risk and benefits of the tests. This discussion enables patients to place the information and circumstances into the context of their own lives, and in the context of their own values. They may choose to undergo noninvasive screening (e.g. ultrasound, triple screen, cell-free fetal DNA screening) or invasive diagnostic testing (amniocentesis or chorionic villus sampling). Invasive diagnostic tests possess a small risk of miscarriage (1–2%) but provide more definitive results. Testing is offered to provide a definitive answer regarding the presence of a certain genetic condition or chromosomal abnormality. Prenatal genetic counseling also comes with ethical concerns both as the parents and as the counselor. It is important to consider all factors that go into the counseling, race, ethnic background, family history, and other significant issues that may arise.

=== Psychiatric genetics ===
Psychiatric genetic counseling is a sub-specialty within genetic counseling focused on helping people living with a psychiatric disorder and/or their family members understand both the genetic and environmental factors that contributed to their illness and address associated emotions such as guilt or self-blame. Genetic counselors also discuss strategies to promote recovery and protect mental health and address any questions on chances for recurrence in other family members. While currently there is no single gene solely responsible for causing a psychiatric disorder, there is strong evidence from family, twin studies, and genome-wide-association studies that both multiple genes and environment interact together. Like other areas of genetic counseling, patients at all different stages of life (pediatric, adult, prenatal) can have psychiatric genetic counseling. Since the etiology of psychiatric disorders is complex and not fully understood, the utility of genetic testing is not as clear as it is in Mendelian or single gene disorders. Research has shown that individuals who receive psychiatric genetic counseling have significant increases in feelings of empowerment and self-efficacy after genetic counseling.

Psychiatric genetic counselors can help "dispel mistaken notions about psychiatric disorders, calm needless anxiety, and help those at risk to draw up a rational plan of action based on the best available information".

== Global Genetic Counseling Community ==
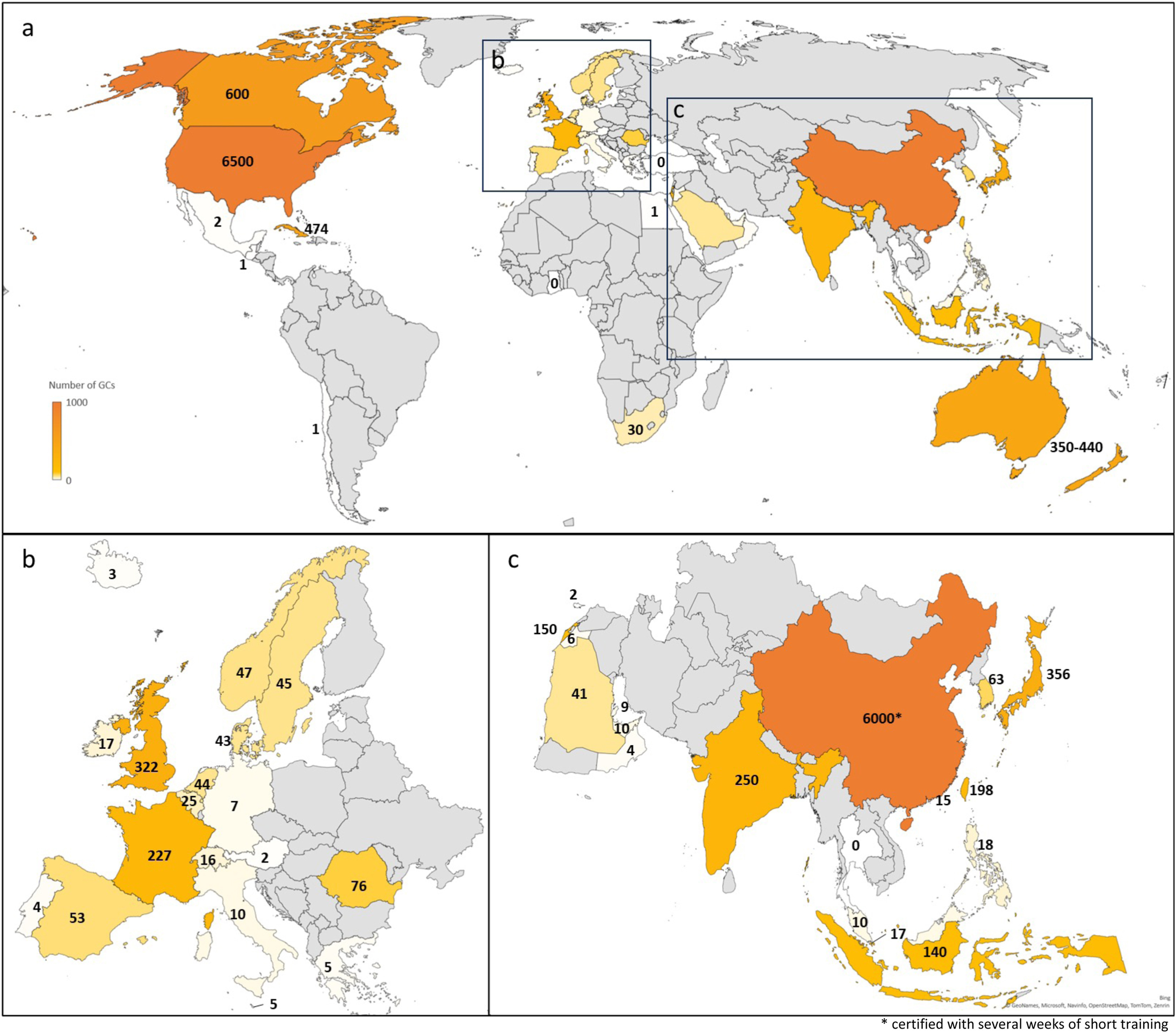
A map showing locations and numbers of practicing genetic counsellors

In 2023, it was estimated there were over 10,000 genetic counsellors globally, practicing in over 45 countries. This is a marked increase over the 2018 data, which showed less than 7000 genetic counselors in at least 28 countries. The increased numbers of genetic counsellors over the period 2018-2023 is mostly accounted for by growth in the number of genetic counsellors in the US.

=== China ===
Genetic counseling in The People's Republic of China has been primarily provided by pediatricians or obstetricians for prenatal or birth defect diagnoses. Most genetic tests can only be performed in academic institutions as research tests or in commercial direct-to-consumer companies for non-clinical use.

In China, genetic counseling is steered by the Chinese Board of Genetic Counseling (CBGC), a not-for-profit organization. CBGC is composed of senior experts engaged in genetic education and research. CBGC is committed to establishing standardized procedures of genetic counseling, training qualified genetic counselors, improving health for all, and reducing the incidence of birth defects. CBGC was established in 2015 and is the major professional organization for genetic counselors in mainland China, providing training through short term online and in-person lectures, educational conferences, and certification for trainees.

Genetics education in China began in the 1980s when selected medical schools began offering genetics courses that focused predominantly on molecular genetics and had limited clinical content. At present, there are no official master's level graduate programs in genetic counseling or clinical genetics in China, and there is great variability in the duration and content of genetics curricula among medical schools and professional organizations.

The Chinese Ministry of Health has not yet recognized genetic counselors as an independent health care occupation. There are no official statistics for the number of health care professionals (e.g., physicians, nurses, and lab technicians) who are providing genetic counseling services in China. As of 2023, it was estimated that there were 4000-6000 genetic counsellors in China, however in China certification to work as a genetic counsellor is given after completing a very short training course (1-2 week equivalent). As such, genetic counsellors in China cannot be held to the same standard as those who are trained in other countries.

=== Africa ===
As of 2024, South Africa is the only country where genetic counsellors practice. Two trained genetic counsellors work as clinical geneticists in Uganda.

==== South Africa ====
Genetic Counselling is a developing field in South Africa. As of 2023, there are about 30 registered genetic counsellors practicing in the country, up from around 20 in 2018. South African genetic counsellors work at public hospitals, academic institutions, in the private health sector (since 2007), private practice (since 2011), and since 2013, in private genetic laboratories. As of 2023, approximately two thirds of all genetic counsellors working in South Africa are employed in the private healthcare sector. This includes the majority of graduates since 2022, owing to a lack of opportunies and funding in the public system. One third of all locally-trained GCs had also left the country by 2023.

Genetic counselling in South Africa is unique due to the genetic profile of the black South African population: oculocutaneous albinism occurs in 1 in every 3900 births, while the founder effect and unusual genetic variants cause the unusual prevalence of Fanconi anaemia, Gaucher's disease, Bardet-Biedl syndrome, and nonsyndromic deafness.

The first genetic counselling programme in South Africa started in 1989 at the University of the Witwatersrand in Johannesburg. A second programme started in 2004 at the University of Cape Town. These are the only two programmes offering master's level genetic counselling training in South Africa. Currently these courses are running at full capacity. This is a two-year degree and includes a research component. The majority of students enter the master's programme with a science background but those with a psychology background are also considered.

The Health Professions Council of South Africa (HPCSA) requires two years of internship. Often the first year forms part of the master's degree in Genetic Counselling and a further 12-month internship thereafter. Genetic Counsellors are required by law to register with the HPCSA in order to practice as genetic counsellors. At the end of the training period, registrants submit a portfolio to the HPCSA for assessment. If successful, the intern will be registered with the HPCSA and will be able to practice as a genetic counsellor in South Africa.

There is a professional organisation for Genetic Counsellors in South Africa, Genetic Counselling South Africa (GC-SA), which provides information and guidance to the HPCSA and others regarding professional issues. The GCSA is a focus group of the South African Society of Human Genetics (SASHG).

==== Ghana ====
The University of Ghana's two-year genetic counselling master's degree began accepting enrolments in 2022. The program, which was made to address an Africa-wide shortage of genetic counsellors, and to facilitate related research, was developed in close collaboration with the two courses in South Africa. Upon graduation, the graduates in Ghana will register with the Psychological Council of Ghana or another regulatory body to enable them to practice in the country.

=== Europe ===
Genetic counselling is still a developing profession in Europe; its practice differs from country to country owing to the structure of the nation's healthcare system, their laws, and their culture. As of 2023, genetic counsellors practice in 19 European nations: Austria, Belgium, Cyprus, Denmark, France, Germany, Greece, Iceland, Ireland, Italy, Malta, Netherlands, Norway, Portugal, Romania, Spain, Sweden, Switzerland and the UK. In 2023 there were about 960 genetic counselors practicing in Europe, a number that has only increased very slightly since 2018. Formal GC registration occurs through two different programs: in the United Kingdom (via the GCRB as described below) and the European Union via the European Board of Medical Genetics (EBMG).

Genetic counselors are not currently recognized as a profession in several European countries including Austria, Belgium, Germany, and Portugal. This is likely due to legal restrictions in these countries, which classify genetic counseling as a medical discipline, and therefore must be conducted by physicians. In Germany, the profession is so under-developed that there is not even a word for 'genetic counsellor' in the German language. However, the German Society for Human Genetics (GfH) and the Professional Association of German Geneticists (Berufsverband der Deutschen Humangenetiker eV, BVDH) have recognized the need to expand genetic counselling services in the country, requiring recognition, scope of practice, competency standards and regulation for genetic counsellors to be negotiated, decided upon, and passed into law where necessary.

Another issue preventing the growth of genetic counseling in Europe is the fact that the scope of practice for GCs varies according to national regulations. For example, in 2024 Switzerland changed their laws so that people receiving genetic analysis must also receive genetic counseling. However, the same law states that this counseling can be conducted by any "competent person", not necessarily a genetic counsellor. Only medical geneticists or genetics-trained doctors can order genetic testing in Switzerland.

==== Training ====
Genetic counsellor training in Europe began in 1992, with 710 students having graduated from genetic counselling training programs across Europe between 1992 and 2022. Cohort sizes are small, ranging from 6-25 students per intake. Student intakes occur every year or every two years depending on the university. Likely reasons for such small student intakes include a dearth of qualified educators, few clinical placement positions for students, and a lack of demand for newly-qualified genetic counsellors in Europe.

EBMG-accredited degrees in genetic counseling offer training aligned with a European core curriculum, so raduates can enter the European genetic counsellor registration system. As of 2026, there are 11 active master's-level training programs certified by the EBMG in the following countries: Austria, France (three programs), Italy, Portugal, Spain, Sweden, and the United Kingdom (three programs). There is also a graduate diploma program in Belgium, which trains students who already have a degree in healthcare. Since 2018, genetic counsellor training in The Netherlands has ceased due to legal problems relating to the private practice of genetic counsellors. However, genetic counselling training remains part of the Master's of Physician Assistant and Advanced Nurse Practice degrees.

==== International and Local Reciprocity ====
Due to the limited numbers of master's level Genetic Counseling programs located in Europe, the EBMG organization recognizes practicing genetic counselors that trained in Australia, Canada, South Africa and the US. These counselors must possess current registration or certification from their home country and must work full time in Europe for one year to apply for registration with EBMG.

==== Professional organizations ====
- The Association of Genetic Nurses and Counsellors (AGNC) is the UK's professional organization representing genetic counsellors, genetic nurses and non-medical, patient-facing staff working within the discipline of Clinical Genetics. As of March 2018, where were 330 AGNC members in the UK. The AGNC is one of the constituent groups of the British Society for Genetic Medicine (BSGM).
- European Board of Medical Genetics (EBMG) developed competencies and standards of practice for GC registration within the European Union (EU).
- The Association of Genetic Counselors (APPAcGen), is working to achieve recognition of the profession of GCs in Portugal.
- The Romanian Association of Genetic Counseling (RAGC) was founded to set national practice standards and lobby for recognition as a distinct health profession. In the meantime, genetic counseling tends to adhere to international organizations' guidelines (e.g., EBMG)
- In Norway there is an "Interest Organization for Genetic Counselors in Norway", which meets yearly.

==== United Kingdom ====
The majority of Genetic Counsellors in the UK work in the National Health Service (NHS) in one of the 33 Regional Clinical Genetics Services (some renamed Genomic Medicine Centres in England), Scotland, Wales or Northern Ireland. Others work in specialist roles in the NHS, education, policy or research. A minority work in the private sector.

Training The first two-year MSc in Genetic Counselling program established in the UK was from the University of Manchester in 1992, followed by Cardiff University in Wales in 2000. 2016 saw major changes in the way genetic counsellors are trained in England. A 3-year training programme funded by Health Education England, the Scientist Training Programme (STP) uses a combination of work-based training in Genomic Medicine Centres and a part-time MSc in genetics (Genomic Counselling) from the University of Manchester. Recruitment is performed nationally through the National School of Healthcare Science (NSHCS). A 3-year part-time MSc in Genetic and Genomic Counselling is also now delivered by Cardiff University, through blended learning, with most of the teaching delivered online, alongside some short face-to-face teaching blocks in Wales. A 2-year MSc Genetic and Genomic Counselling program began at the University of Glasgow in Scotland in 2016. Prerequisites for acceptance into these programs include a degree (relevant science, nursing or midwifery), and experience in a caring role.

Credentialing/certification/licensure Genetic counselling training programmes are accredited by the UK Genetic Counsellor Registration Board (GCRB) and the European Board of Medical Genetics (EBMG). Genetic counsellors in the UK are regulated through the GCRB, although as of 2018 GCRB registration is voluntary. The GCRB registry was accredited in 2016 by the Professional Standards Authority under its Accredited Registers programme. Over 200 genetic counsellors were registered through the GCRB as of 2018. Genetic Counsellors trained through the STP programme are expected to be eligible to apply for statutory regulation through the Health Care Professions Council and it is planned that soon there will be equivalence arrangements with the GCRB to ensure statutory regulation for GCRB registered genetic counsellors. In order to be eligible for GCRB credentialing, one of two sets of requirements must be met: completion of a 2-year Master's of Science degree and 2 years of experience as a genetic counselor, or completion of a 3-year combined master's program and work-based training. In addition, a portfolio including a 50 case logbook, evidence of supervision, case studies, essays, and recorded counseling sessions is required.

In order to be eligible for EBMG credentialing, a Master's of Science in genetic counseling is required, along with a portfolio including a logbook of 50 cases, case studies, references, and reflective essays. Both the EBMG and the GCRB also offer an alternative route to credentialing in which the applicant completes a nursing degree. The GCRB offers credentialing for internationally trained genetic counselors.

=== Asia-Pacific ===
==== Australia & New Zealand ====
Genetic counselling in Australasia has developed similarly to the US. As of early 2022, there were almost 400 active genetic counsellors in Australia and New Zealand, according to the database maintained by the Australasian Society of Genetic Counsellors. This represents 346 FTE genetic counsellors working in clinical practice, an increase of more than 50% since 2017. However, in 2023 it was estimated that there was demand enough for 418 FTE GCs in Australasia. Workforce demand planning is complicated by the fact that one third of individuals with a GC degree in Australia are not in clinical practice, and there is a shortage of GC roles in the public system due to a lack of funding.

Most GCs practice in public or private hospital settings, but roles in private ambulatory care, genomic diagnostic laboratories, industry, and in academia (teaching and research) are becoming increasingly common. Both public and private healthcare services are available in Australia and New Zealand. Genetic services are offered through the public health system in all states and territories. In the public system, genetic testing is paid for by the state governments when the test is deemed clinically appropriate by the GC and clinical geneticist. GCs in private practice may also offer 'self-funded' genetic testing, which is paid for out-of-pocket by the client/patient. Economic modelling commissioned by the HGSA in 2024 found that adding genetic counselling to the Medicare system would produce $2.53 in benefits for every dollar spent on genetic counselling services. These benefits are made up of economic and social savings arising from reductions in treatment delays and reductions in premature deaths, and benefits relating to easier access to genetic counselling services.

===== Training =====
GC training in Australia began with the first one-year graduate diploma program in 1995, the first two-year master's level training program was established in 2008. In order to practice as a GC as of 2025, individuals must first attain a master's degree in genetic counselling, after which time they can practice as an associate genetic counsellor. Then, following at least two years of supervised practice and successful passing of assessment as set by the Australasian Society of Genetic Counsellors' Board of Censors, an individual can then be accredited by the Human Genetics Society of Australasia (HGSA) and registered through the National Alliance of Self Regulating Health Professions as an independent GC.

Genetic counselling education in Australia is clinically focussed. As of 2024, two master's training programs in Australia accredited by the Human Genetics Society of Australasia (HGSA), one at the University of Melbourne and one at the University of Technology Sydney. The University of Melbourne course costs A$60,884 for domestic students and A$138,567 for international students as of 2025. The UTS course costs A$81,200 for domestic students and A$121,760 for international students as of 2025. Together, these two universities produce more than 30 graduates each year.

===== Reciprocity =====
Genetic counselors with training from the UK, Europe and Australia are eligible for registration and GCs qualified in other countries are considered on a case-by-case basis. Information is available through the Australasian Society of Genetic Counsellors, a special interest group of the Human Genetics Society of Australasia.

===== Demographics =====
A 2023 survey of GCs in Australia & NZ provided insight into the self-reported demographics of practicing GCs with a view to understanding the diversity, inclusion, and capacities of the GC workforce. The survey found 92% of Australasian GCs are female, 93% live in major cities, two identified as Māori, one identified as an Aboriginal Australian, and none identified as a Torres Strait Islander. 81% were proficient in English only and 64% did not report any religious affiliation. These and many other demographic factors were found to be significantly different to the populations of Australia & New Zealand. Many GCs also reported their teams were not diverse in these and other areas, but that initiatives to make diversity visible were widely used.

==== Malaysia ====
As of 2025, clinical geneticists perform most genetic counselling duties in Malaysia, and there is an acute need for more genetic counsellors to provide services to clients. The National University of Malaysia is home to the only Genetic Counselling master's program (as a Master of Medical Science) in the country as of 2025.

==== Singapore ====
As of 2026, 21 genetic counsellors work across the SingHealth Duke-NUS Institute of Precision Medicine, the National Cancer Centre Singapore, and the KK Women's and Children's Hospital. While a master's degree in genetic counselling is required to work as a genetic counsellor in Singapore, there are no such programs in the country; the closest being an executive certificate in clinical genomics which is intended to upskill healthcare workers.

=== North America ===
==== Education ====
A genetic counselor is an expert with a Master of Science degree in genetic counseling. Programs in North America are accredited by the Accreditation Council for Genetic Counseling (ACGC). There are currently 52 accredited programs in the United States, four accredited programs in Canada, and four programs with the intent to become accredited. Students enter the field from a variety of disciplines, including biological sciences, social sciences, and psychology. Graduate school coursework includes topics such as human genetics, embryology, ethics, research, and counseling theory and techniques. Clinical training including supervised rotations in prenatal, pediatric, adult, cancer, and other subspecialty clinics, as well as non-patient facing rotations in laboratories. Research training typically culminates in a capstone or thesis project.

==== State licensure ====
As of May 2019, 29 states have passed genetic counselor licensure bills that require genetic counselors to meet a certain set of standards to practice. These states are Alabama, Arkansas, California, Connecticut, Delaware, Georgia, Hawaii, Idaho, Illinois, Indiana, Iowa, Kentucky, Louisiana, Massachusetts, Michigan, Minnesota, Nebraska, New Hampshire, New Jersey, New Mexico, North Dakota, Ohio, Oklahoma, Pennsylvania, South Dakota, Tennessee, Utah, Virginia, and Washington. Almost every other state in the United States is in the process of obtaining genetic counseling licensure.

Although genetic counseling has been established over four decades, the first licenses for genetic counselors were not issued until 2002. Utah was the first state to do so. The American Society of Human Genetics (ASHG) has since encouraged more states to license genetic counselors before they are allowed to practice. ASHG argues that requiring practitioners to go through the necessary training and testing to obtain a license will ensure quality genetic services as well as allow for reimbursement for counselors' services. Laws requiring licensure ensure that "professionals who call themselves genetic counselors are able to properly explain complicated test results that could confuse patients and families making important health decisions".

==== Reimbursement and recognition ====
Insurance companies usually do not reimburse for unlicensed genetic counselors' services. Patients who may benefit from genetic counseling may not be able to afford the service due to the expensive out-of-pocket cost. In addition, licensure allows genetic counselors to be searchable in most insurance companies' databases which gives genetic counselors increased opportunities for earning revenue and clients the opportunity to see "the level of coverage insurers provide for their services".

The Center for Medicare and Medicaid Services (CMS) does not currently recognize genetic counselors as healthcare providers and therefore does not reimburse for genetic counseling services unless they are provided by a physician or nurse practitioner. On June 12, 2019, H.R. 3235 "Access to Genetic Counselor Services Act of 2019", was introduced to the U.S. House of Representatives by U.S. Rep. Dave Loebsack (D-Iowa) and U.S. Rep. Mike Kelly (R-Pennsylvania). H.R. 3235 would authorize CMS to recognize certified genetic counselors as healthcare providers and to cover services furnished by genetic counselors under part B of the Medicare program. Genetic counselors are those licensed by states as such, or, for those in states without licensure, the Secretary of Health and Human Services will set criteria through regulation (likely ABGC certification). Genetic counselors would be paid at 85% of the physician fee schedule. Other providers currently providing genetic counseling services will not be affected by the bill.

==== Employment outlook ====
As genetic counseling continues to grow as a branch in the medical field, employment rates of genetic counselors are expected to grow by 21% over the next decade; this statistic suggests that approximately 600 new jobs will become available in the US over this time period. Graduating from an accredited program with a passing score on the board certification exam increases the job prospect. As of May 2019 the median annual wage for genetic counselors was $81,880; the lowest 10% earning less than $61,310 and the highest 10% earning more than $114,750. This includes the varying industries in this field, such as medial and diagnostic laboratories, offices of physicians, hospitals, and colleges/universities.

=== Latin America and the Caribbean ===
Cuba is the only country in Latin America with a significant number of GCs, all of whom work for the Ministry of Health's National Center for Medical Genetics. In all other Latin American countries, GCs are either rare or non-existent. The development of genetic counselling in Latin America is hampered by lack of awareness and a dearth of research into genetic counselling the diverse patient populations of the region. Training programs exist in Brazil (Master's at the University of São Paulo), Cuba, and Chile (postgraduate diploma) and it is known that GCs work in Guatemala and Mexico. GCs in this area are supported by the Latin American Professional Society of Genetic Counseling which was formed in 2021 and provides educational resources, networking opportunities, and professional development.

==== Cuba ====
Genetic services, including genetic counselling, were developed in Cuba to combat two serious medical issues where genetics plays a role: neural tube defects causing infant mortality, and the high frequency of sickle cell disease among Cubans (due to the founder effect). Genetic counselling services were further bolstered by the findings of an epidemiological survey in 2001-2003 of Cuba's disabled community which identified many individuals living with Down syndrome and Fragile X syndrome. This led to the formation of many new places in genetic counselling training programs from which 837 GCs graduated from 11 training intakes.

As of 2009, each of Cuba's 168 municipalities had at least two GCs to serve the population. In 2017 it was estimated there were 900 master's-qualified GCs in the country, while a 2023 update revised this number down to 474. This decrease is attributed to emigration, retirement, and deaths due to COVID-19. Re-certification is needed every 10 years.

=== The Middle East ===
The number of genetic counsellors in this region increased from 100 in 2018 to 220 in 2023. In Israel, there were 150 licensed genetic counselors as of 2023, who must work under the supervision of a medical geneticist. Most practice in genetics departments in hospital settings, with a few working in industry or research. 10 genetic counsellors work in Qatar as of 2024, where issues such as significant consanguinity (among both Qatari and expatriate populations) and the widespread belief in supernatural causes for genetic disorders, affect the population's engagement with genetic healthcare and the work of genetic counsellors. Bahrain, Iran, Jordan, Palestine, Qatar, Saudi Arabia and the UAE all have mandatory genetic premarital screening programs, however public knowledge of these programs, and of the potential negative outcomes of inbreeding, remains low in Gulf countries.

==== Training ====
The first training program in Israel started in 1997. There are currently three programs that offer a master's degree in genetic counseling, training 20 students per year. The first training program in Saudi Arabia was a graduate diploma in 2005 with a master's degree being available as of 2015. There are two training programs in Saudi Arabia with approximately 10 genetic counselors graduating per year.

Master's level training programs were instituted in Qatar in 2018, Turkiye in 2020, the UAE in 2024, and one is in the advanced planning stages at Sultan Qaboos University in Oman.

==== Credentialing/certification/licensure ====
The Israeli Ministry of Health offers licensure to genetic counselors in Israel following an exam written one year after their post-graduate work and 85-case logbook. Recertification is not required as licensure is permanent after the exam. Licensure is also offered through the Saudi Commission for Health Specialties (SCHS) following a panel interview, testing, or oral exam by a medical board; recertification in this country is under review at this time, but all counselors practicing in Saudi Arabia are expected to obtain a license from the SCHS.

== Media ==
Genetic counselling is routinely performed via telehealth

The National Society of Genetic Counselors (NSGC) blog provides information about current topics in genetic testing and genetic counseling.

=== Public attitude ===
Many studies have examined the attitudes of the lay public toward genetic counseling and genetic testing. Barriers to obtaining genetic counseling include lack of understanding of genetics by both patients and healthcare providers, concerns about cost and insurance, and fears of stigma or discrimination.

The reach of genetic testing and health equity is expanding due to telephone counseling. Telephone delivery has proven "less expensive, yielded non-inferior cognitive, minimized psychological distress, facilitated informed decision making, and achieved positive counselor-patient interactions". As a result, telephone-based genetic counseling and testing are now commonly offered and reimbursed by many insurance companies.

No simple correlation has been found between the change in technology to the changes in values and beliefs towards genetic testing.

=== Health disparities ===
An increase in genetic counseling outreach efforts are needed to intentionally extend opportunities to populations that have been historically underrepresented in the profession to create a more diverse and inclusive workforce and access to services. Given the history of low engagement of under-represented minority populations in both clinical genetic services and genetic research, both of these aspects will be challenged and must be addressed before the benefits of precision medicine will be fully realized.

== Future Directions ==
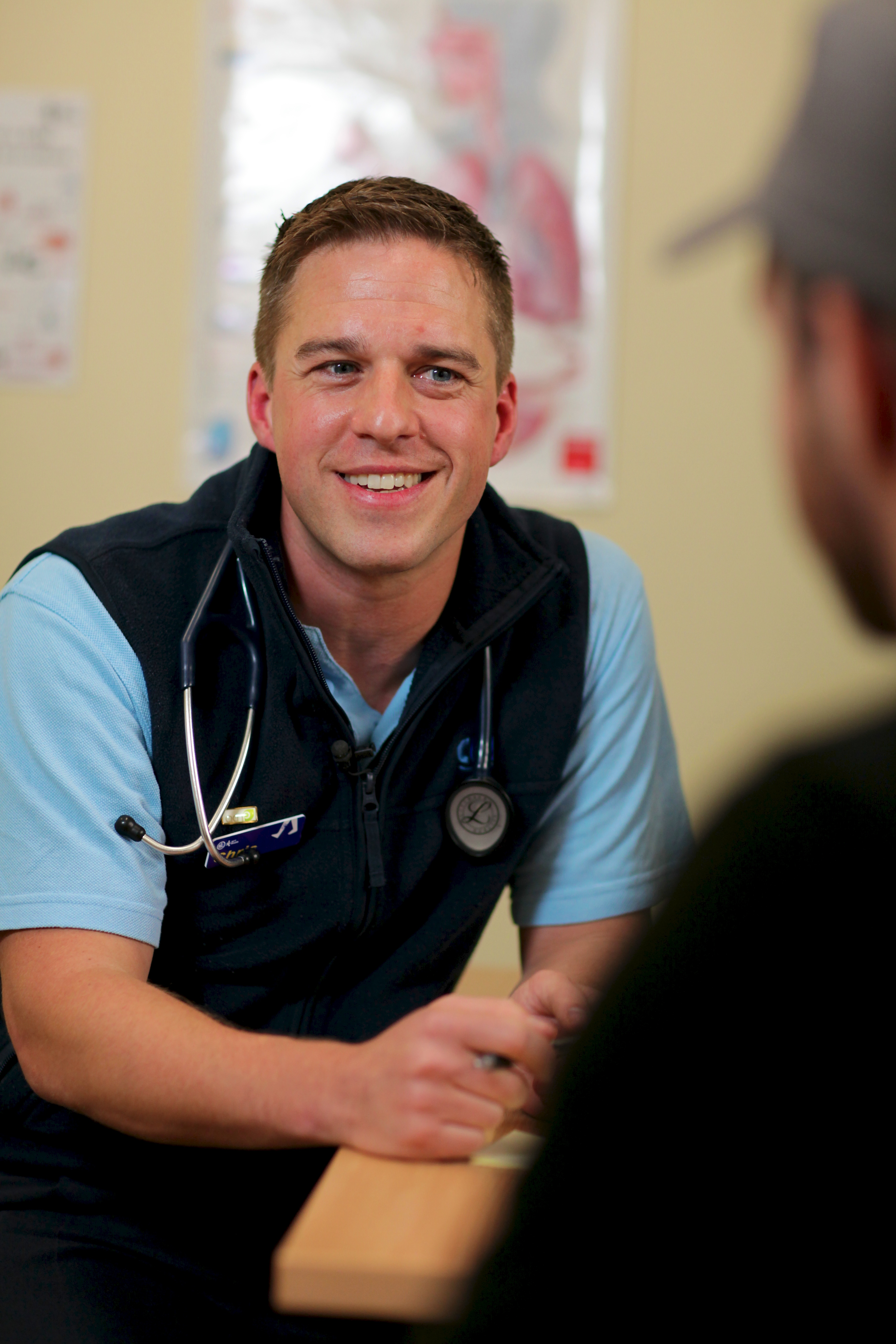
Nurses can be trained to identify patients that may benefit from mainstreamed genetic testing

In Europe and Australia, the current model of care in genetic counselling involves clients being referred by a general practitioner or other medical professional to a publicly funded hospital-based genetics service. Due to the rapid increase in demand for genetic counselling services, new ways to integrate genetic counselling into the healthcare system are being actively investigated. Future potential models of care currently being trialled include the genetic counsellor-embedded model, where genetic counsellors are integrated into hospital departments from which patients are referred, such as cancer and immunology. Another model of care that has been investigated is the provision of specially-trained nurses or other non-genetics healthcare personnel to identify persons eligible for genetic testing, and to provide pre-test counselling. Taken together, these alternative models of care are called genetic counselling mainstreaming. Mainstreaming has also been proposed to alleviate the administrative and clinical workload of GCs, as other healthcare providers would take on aspects of genetic counselling. An Australian study in 2025 found high levels of satisfaction and approval of mainstreamed genetic testing among parents of children with inborn errors of immunity where mainstreamed genetic testing was undertaken to help find a diagnosis for the child's condition.

== See also ==
- Genomic counseling
- National Society of Genetic Counselors
- Reprogenetics
- Whole genome sequencing
- Medical genetics
