= Theoretical and Applied Genetics =

- Discipline: Genetics, genomics, botany
- Language: English
- Edited by: Albrecht E. Melchinger

Publication details
- Former name: Der Züchter
- History: 1929–present
- Publisher: Springer Science+Business Media
- Frequency: 8/year
- Open access: Hybrid
- Impact factor: 4.439 (2019)

Standard abbreviations
- ISO 4: Theor. Appl. Genet.

Indexing
- CODEN: THAGA6
- ISSN: 0040-5752 (print); 1432-2242 (web)
- LCCN: 91643825
- OCLC no.: 4624238

Links
- Journal homepage

Theoretical and Applied Genetics is a peer-reviewed scientific journal published by Springer Science+Business Media. The journal publishes articles in the fields of plant genetics, genomics, and biotechnology. It was established in 1929 as Der Züchter, which name was changed to the current one in 1968. Previous editors include H. Stubbe (1946–1976) and H. F. Linskens (1977–1987). The journal publishes only original research articles.

== Abstracting and indexing ==
Theoretical and Applied Genetics is abstracted and indexed in Aquatic Sciences and Fisheries Abstracts, Chemical Abstracts, Current Contents, PubMed, Science Citation Index, and Scopus. According to the Journal Citation Reports, its 2010 impact factor is 3.264. This ranks it second out of 74 journals in the category "Agronomy", first out of 30 in "Horticulture", 23rd out of 187 in "Plant Sciences", and 59th out of 156 in "Genetics & Heredity".
