= National Society of Genetic Counselors =

Organization in Chicago, Illinois, US

- Abbreviation: NSGC
- Formation: 1979
- Type: Professional society
- Headquarters: Chicago, IL
- Location: United States
- Members: 3,600+
- President: Sara Riordon, MS, CGC
- Website: nsgc.org

The National Society of Genetic Counselors (NSGC), founded and incorporated in 1979, is the largest association of genetic counselors with over 3,600 members. Its membership includes genetic counselors and other healthcare professionals working in the field of medical genetics from the United States, Canada, and around the world.

NSCG has a code of ethics which provides guidance to the members on the ethical responsibilities of a genetic counselor. This code is reviewed periodically to best represent the current needs of the public and of genetic counselors. There is also a conflict of interest policy, which addresses possible conflicts of interest of members when they are acting on behalf of NSGC.

There are similar associations, such as the Canadian Association of Genetic Counselors, the Association of Genetic Nurses and Counsellors, the Professional Society of Genetic Counselors in Asia, and the Australasian Society of Genetic Counsellors for those genetic counselors who are currently practicing in Canada, the UK and Ireland, Asia, Australia, and New Zealand, respectively.

== Leadership ==
The NSGC Board of Directors consists of the president, secretary/treasurer, immediate past president, executive director, and directors at large.

Other leadership roles, including the chair, vice-chair, and NSGC Board Liaison positions, can exist within committees. Other groups within the NSGC include the Ethics Advisory Group, the Jane Engelberg Memorial Fellowship (JEMF) Advisory Group, and the Audrey Heimler Special Projects Award Committee.

NSGC leadership positions are volunteer roles obtained through member voting, appointment, or self-nomination, depending on the position.

There are several special interest groups that provide a smaller group setting for education, consultation, and activity within a specific clinical subspecialty.

== Policy and publications ==
NSGC advocates on a number of issues related to genetic counseling, including support and strategic guidance for state licensure, federal efforts on improving services and professional standing, awareness on cultural competency, as well as various workforce initiatives.

NSGC also maintains a variety of publications regarding the profession and practice of genetic counseling:

- Journal of Genetic Counseling: the official peer-reviewed journal of the National Society of Genetic Counselors, available nationally and internationally.
- Practice guidelines (published since 2015): NSGC practice guidelines are developed by author groups composed of NSGC members and other content experts. Each guideline is based on systematic evidence review. Once approved, practice guidelines are published in peer-reviewed journals.
- Practice Guidelines (published prior to 2015): documents published prior to 2015 as practice guidelines have not gone through the systematic evidence review that is now required by NSGC.
- Position statements: reflect concrete applications of the society’s Code of Ethics and other official documentsl.
- Professional Status Survey results offer an inside view of the profession.
- Perspectives in Genetic Counseling: a member-only digital magazine with articles of interest to NSGC members.
- Patient resource website: Genetic counseling-focused web resources developed and maintained by the National Society of Genetic Counselors for use by the public.

== Continuing education ==
Continuing education enables genetic counselors to remain current on new technologies and testing modalities, and on relevant psychosocial, ethical, and legal implications. Typically, genetic counselors require a certain number of continuing education units) (CEUs) to keep their certification and licensure active. NSGC has numerous continuing education programs for genetic counselors through the provision of CEUs in courses and conferences. CEUs earned through NSGC-approved educational opportunities are accepted by the American Board of Genetic Counseling for purposes of Genetic Counselor recertification.

The NSGC Annual Conference, usually held in the fall in a U.S. city, typically offers a certain number of CEUs each year. The conference covers a variety of topics applicable to genetic counselors in a variety of specialties, as well as other healthcare providers. The conference is open to NSGC members, as well as non-members.

NSGC also offers an online education center with professional courses on topics including business of healthcare, clinical skills, policy issues, professional development, technology, and past conference recordings.

== See also ==
- Genetic testing
- Health care
