= Chorionic villus sampling =

Prenatal genetic disorder test

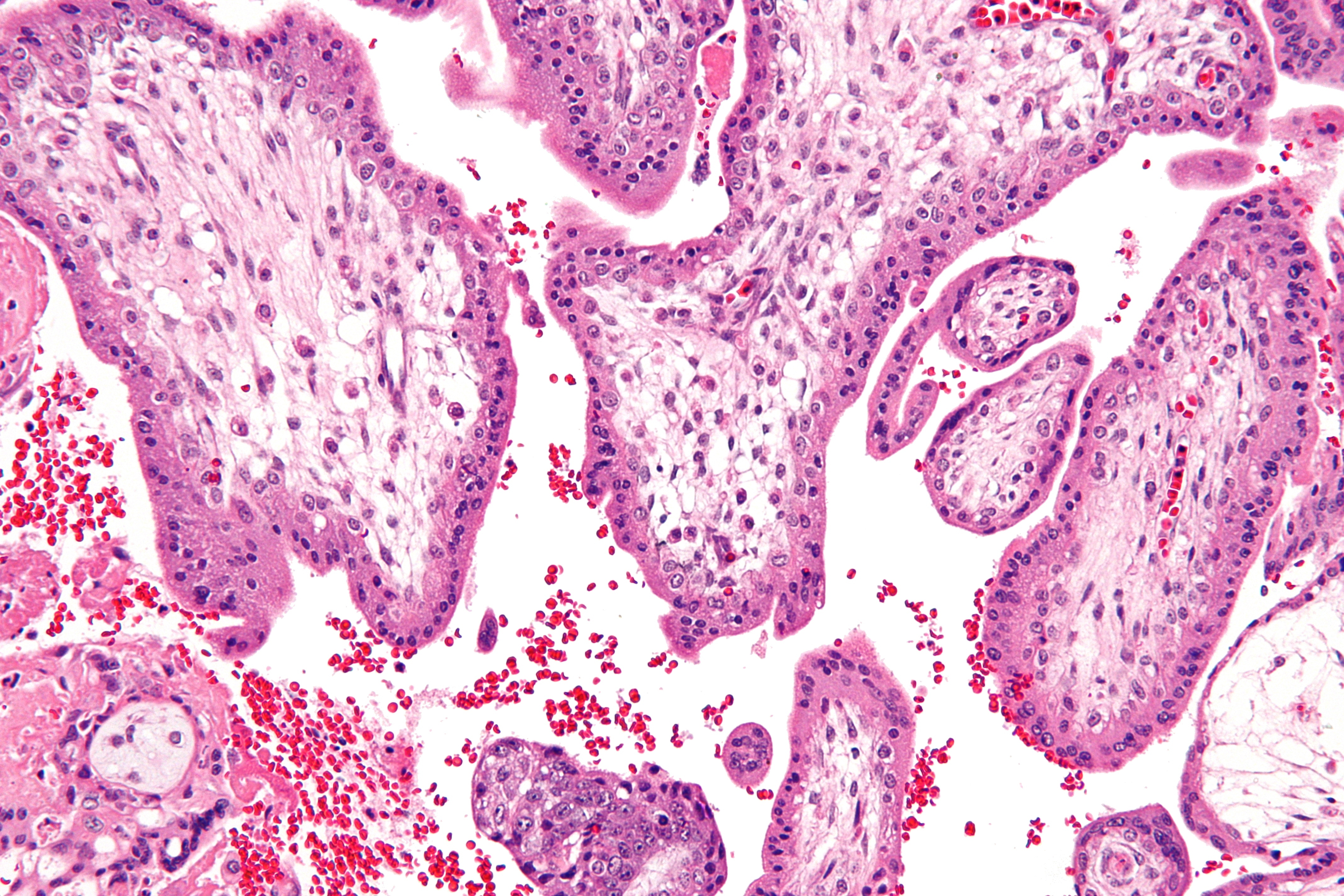
- Micrograph showing chorionic villi—the tissue that is collected in CVS. H&E stain.
- Other names: CVS
- ICD-10-PCS: 16603-00
- ICD-9-CM: 75.33
- MeSH: D015193
- MedlinePlus: 003406

Chorionic villus sampling (CVS), sometimes called "chorionic villous sampling" (as "villous" is the adjectival form of the word "villus"), is a form of prenatal diagnosis done to determine chromosomal or genetic disorders in the fetus. It entails sampling of the chorionic villus (placental tissue) and testing it for chromosomal abnormalities, usually with FISH or PCR. CVS usually takes place at 10–12 weeks' gestation, earlier than amniocentesis or percutaneous umbilical cord blood sampling. It is the preferred technique before 15 weeks.

CVS was performed for the first time in Milan by Italian biologist Giuseppe Simoni, scientific director of Biocell Center, in 1983. Use as early as eight weeks in special circumstances has been described. It can be performed in a transcervical or transabdominal manner. Although this procedure is mostly associated with testing for Down syndrome, overall, CVS can detect more than 200 disorders.

== Indications ==
Possible reasons for having a CVS can include:

- Abnormal first trimester screen results
- Increased nuchal translucency or other abnormal ultrasound findings
- Family history of a chromosomal abnormality or other genetic disorder
- Parents are known carriers for a genetic disorder
- Advanced maternal age (maternal age above 35). AMA is associated with increase risk of Down's syndrome and at age 35, risk is 1:400. Screening tests are usually carried out first before deciding if CVS should be done.

== Risks ==
The risk of miscarriage in CVS is estimated to be potentially as high as 1–2%. However some recent research has suggested that only a very small number of miscarriages that occur after CVS are a direct result of the procedure. Apart from a risk of miscarriage, there is a risk of infection and amniotic fluid leakage. The resulting amniotic fluid leak can develop into a condition known as oligohydramnios, which is low amniotic fluid level. If the resulting oligohydramnios is not treated and the amniotic fluid continues to leak it can result in the baby developing hypoplastic lungs (underdeveloped lungs).

Additionally, there is also mild risk of limb reduction defects associated with CVS, with the risk being higher the earlier the procedure is carried.

It is important after having CVS that the obstetrician follows the patient closely to ensure the patient does not develop infection.

== Chorionic villi and stem cells ==
Recent studies have discovered that chorionic villi can be a rich source of fetal stem cells, multipotent mesenchymal stem cells.

A potential benefit of using fetal stem cells over those obtained from embryos is that they side-step ethical concerns among anti-abortion activists by obtaining pluripotent lines of undifferentiated cells without harm to a fetus or destruction of an embryo. These stem cells would also, if used to treat the same individual they came from, sidestep the donor/recipient issue which has so far stymied all attempts to use donor-derived stem cells in therapies.

Artificial heart valves, working tracheas, as well as muscle, fat, bone, heart, neural and liver cells have all been engineered through use of fetal stem cells.

The first fetal stem cells bank in US is active in Boston, Massachusetts.

== Limitations ==
A small percentage (1-2%) of pregnancies have confined placental mosaicism, where some but not all of the placental cells tested in the CVS are abnormal, even though the pregnancy is unaffected. Cells from the mother can be mixed with the placental cells obtained from the CVS procedure. Occasionally if these maternal cells are not completely separated from the placental sample, this can lead to discrepancies with the results. This phenomenon is called Maternal Cell Contamination (MCC). CVS cannot detect all birth defects. It is used for testing chromosomal abnormalities or other specific genetic disorders only if there is family history or other reason to test.

== See also ==
- Amniocentesis
- Cell-free fetal DNA
- Elective genetic and genomic testing
- Percutaneous umbilical cord blood sampling
- Prenatal testing
