= Generalized arterial calcification of infancy =

- Other names: Idiopathic infantile arterial calcification (IIAC), arterial calcification of infancy, idiopathic arterial calcification of infancy (IACI), occlusive infantile arterial calcification, occlusive infantile arteriopathy
- Specialty: Medical genetics

Generalized arterial calcification of infancy (GACI) is an extremely rare genetic disorder. It is caused by mutations in the ENPP1 gene in 75% of the subjects or in mutations in the ABCC6 genes in 10% of patients. However, sometimes individuals affected with GACI do not have mutations in the ENPP1 or ABCC6 gene and in those cases the cause of the disorder is unknown.

The condition usually affects infants during the first 6 months of life. This condition is inherited as an autosomal recessive pattern. It is characterized by generalized calcification of the arterial internal elastic lamina, leading to rupture of the lamina and occlusive changes in the tunica intima with stenosis and decreased elasticity of the vessel wall. Unfortunately, many infants die of vaso-occlusive disease, especially of the coronary arteries.

== Types ==
There are 2 forms of GACI that can be indicated on a genetic test:

GACI Type 1 is caused by mutations in the ENPP1 gene. It is called ENPP1 Deficiency. Patients with the ENPP1 Deficiency are at risk of developing Autosomal Recessive Hypophosphatemic Rickets Type 2 (ARHR2). ARHR2 can cause weakening in the bones, pain in bones and joints bone deformities (knocked knees, bowed legs), dental problems, calcification of ligaments and short stature. With proper treatment the bones can be strengthened and side effects minimized.

GACI Type 2 is caused by mutations in the ABCC6 gene. It is called ABCC6 Deficiency. As children affected by GACI due to ABCC6 Deficiency get older, they can develop characteristics similar to pseudoxanthoma elasticum (PXE). This condition affects the elastic tissue of the skin, the eye, cardiovascular and gastrointestinal systems.

== Signs and symptoms ==
Clinical presentation is variable. First symptoms usually occur at birth but can take place in the first 6 months of life or in utero.

Clinical Signs for GACI can include:

- Decreased fetal activity
- Gestation with an antenatal diagnosis of hydrops fetalis
- Polyhydramnios
- Pericardial effusion
- Low biophysical profile
- Marked cyanosis
- Edema
- Severe hypertension
- Reduced or absent pulses
- Refusal of feeds
- Tachypnea
- Vomiting
- Abdominal distension
- General arterial rigidity
- Cardiac failure (most common clinical finding)
- Strain pattern on electrocardiogram
- Enlarged heart (cardiomegaly)
- Echogenicity of the arteries and/or heart on imaging
- High Blood Pressure (hypertension)
- Respiratory distress
- Blood vessel narrowing
- Joint calcifications
- Hearing loss
- Kidney failure
- Gastrointestinal complications

== Cause ==
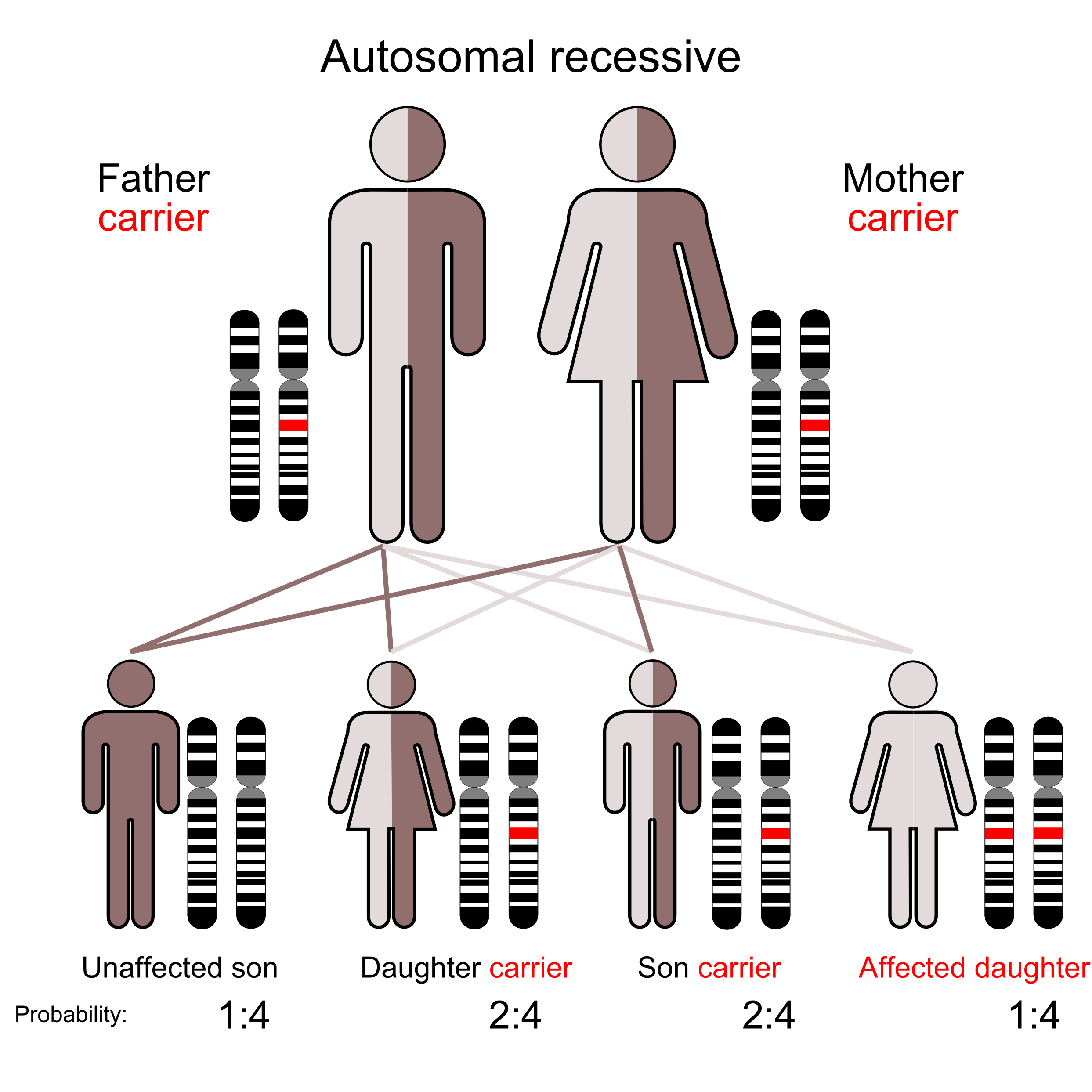
GACI is inherited in an autosomal recessive pattern.

The condition results from an inactivating mutation in the ecto-nucleotide pyrophosphatase/phosphodiesterase-1 (ENPP1 gene) or the ATP-binding C member 6 (ABBC6 gene), leading to decreased inorganic pyrophosphate (PPi). This is a potent inhibitor of calcium deposition in the vessel wall. These mutations allow for unregulated calcium deposition within muscular arteries. The symptoms are caused by calcification of large and medium-sized arteries, including the aorta, coronary arteries, and renal arteries.

Recently, homozygous or compound heterozygous mutations for ENPP1 gene were reported as causative for the disorder. ENPP1 regulates extracellular inorganic pyrophosphate (PPi), a major inhibitor of extracellular matrix calcification.

The critical period for babies affected by GACI is during the first 6 months after birth. This is due to calcium continuing to build up in the artery walls. If blood flow becomes restricted it can become life threatening.

GACI affects males and females equally and occurs in populations all across the world. It is estimated to occur in approximately 1 out of every 391,000 births with the carrier rate being 1:312. Survival statistics vary greatly.

== Diagnosis ==
Generalized arterial calcification of infancy should always be considered in infants and children presenting with hypertension, cardiac failure, or sudden death. Plain radiography, sonography and MRI can aid in the diagnosis. Postnatal gray-scale and color Doppler echocardiographic and sonographic examinations allowed noninvasive diagnosis, assessment of severity, and monitoring of progression. Contrast-enhanced MR angiography with breath-hold and cardiac gating techniques can allow evaluation of the extent of the disease.

- Dilated and hypertrophied ventricles
- Extramedullary hematopoiesis of liver
- Hypertrophy of myocardium
- Bright and hyper-reflective myocardium
- Periarticular calcifications in the wrists, ears, shoulders, ankles and hip
- Heart usually looks structurally normal
- Cardiomegaly and pulmonary plethora
- Diffuse arterial calcification involving aorta, carotid, cerebral, renal, mesenteric and cardiac arteries
- Echo-dense aortic annulus, ascending aorta, transverse arch, descending aorta, main pulmonary artery, and coronary arteries unusually.
- Abdominal ultrasound can reveal hepatosplenomegaly, ascites, renal echogenicity and diffused arterial calcifications involving the aorta, common iliac, splenic, and renal arteries, as well as peritoneal calcifications involving the visceral peritoneum overlying the liver and intestine
- Brain ultrasound can show dilated lateral ventricles, poorly developed corpus callosum, and leukomalacia
- Echocardiogram can reveal a structurally normal heart, normal ventricular function, however mild concentric ventricular hypertrophy and multiple intracardiac as well as vascular calcifications
- Generalized arterial calcification of infancy should be suspected when there is hyperechogenicity of vessel walls, evidence of polyhydramnios or a past history of early neonatal deaths.
- DNA testing can identify one of the mutations responsible for the condition

== Prevention ==
- Potential role of genetic markers in the identification of persons at risk. There is a 75% probability to identify the two ENPP1 mutations or 10% with ABCC6 mutations (one paternal, one maternal) that cause GACI. Once the mutations are identified, preimplantation genetic diagnosis (PGD) or chorionic villus sampling (CVS) are possible options to identify the condition, either before or during pregnancy.
- At week 20 of gestation, it is possible to detect an Echogenic intracardiac focus (EIF) or intravascular calcifications, particularly in the iliac and [abdominal aorta]. EIF is a small bright spot seen in the baby's heart on an ultrasound exam. This is thought to represent mineralization, or small deposits of calcium hydroxyapatite, in the muscle of the heart. EIFs are found in about 3-5% of normal pregnancies and cause no health problems.
- Ultrasound can show subtle intravascular calcifications, particularly in the abdominal aorta at week 23.
- Calcification has been detected at 33 weeks' gestation.
- The earliest detected manifestation (echogenic foci in the mitral valve Hepatic vascular) of the disease was prenatally at 14 weeks gestation.

== Treatment ==
- Currently, there is no curative treatment for GACI. However, in recent years, better medical treatment has led to increased survival rates.
- Use of bisphosphonates appears to significantly increase survival. Etidronate, a non-nitrogen-containing bisphosphonate, is the most commonly used based on its potent antimineralization effect.
- Prenatal and postnatal treatment with low-dose, cyclical bisphosphonates, also called diphosphonate, resulted in a complete resolution of vascular calcifications in some cases using disodium pamidronate and risedronate.
- Sodium Thiosulfate (STS) is a calcium-chelating agent. It is typically used by patients who have excess calcium in their arteries due to kidney disease. In recent years, STS has also been used to treat patients with GACI.Proposed mechanism of STS action includes chelation or increased solubility of over mineralized calcium in arteries to be removed from the body. STS is typically administered intravenously through a central line in the chest. The dosage amount and length of time for STS treatment is determined by the patient's medical team.
- PGE1 infusion is a possible therapeutic alternative for babies with idiopathic arterial calcification complicated by severe hypertension refractory to conventional treatment.
- Infants must reach a certain weight to allow for a transplant, commonly not reached. There is minimal information available about heart transplants in patients with GACI. There is some clinical evidence that heart transplants can be successful, without recurrence of calcifications. Heart transplant for individuals with GACI has occurred in at least 3 known cases. In 2014, there was a follow up report about a 4 year old child with GACI who had a successful heart transplant.

== Prognosis ==
- Survival to adulthood has been reported, sometimes with persistent hypertension and cardiovascular sequelae.
- Spontaneous regression of arterial calcifications can occur, and antihypertensive treatment can be tapered off gradually. In some patients, the natural course of GACI may be more favourable than previously assumed.
- Despite the same genotype and similar sonographic and radiographic features in early infancy, the phenotype of GACI can vary to a great extent within one family.

== Research ==
In 2015, Demetrios Braddock, MD, PhD, a pathologist and professor from Yale University along with his team published an article in Nature Communications. Their research revealed when mice with GACI were given a replacement version of the enzyme, it helped to reduce the calcifications and prevented the animals from dying. This discovery has led to the development of Inozyme Pharma a biotechnology company developing new medicines to treat rare disorders of calcification including GACI.

== See also ==
- ENPP1
