= EIFS =

EIFS may refer to:

- Exterior insulation finishing system
- Extended interframe space

== See also ==
- EIF (disambiguation)
