= INZ-701 =

Experimental drug

Legal status
- Legal status: Investigational

Identifiers
- DrugBank: DB17629
- UNII: 8ZH1P9LXW1

INZ-701 is a recombinant ENPP1 enzyme developed to treat some genetic disorders that prevent normal production of ENPP1. It is developed by Inozyme Pharma.
