= Echogenicity =

Ability to bounce an echo

Obstetric ultrasonography of twins at a gestational age of almost 9 weeks. The mother’s and the twins’ bodies have a higher echogenicity than the amniotic fluid around them. The standard representation is brighter color for higher echogenicity, giving the almost anechoic fluid an almost black appearance.

Echogenicity (sometimes as echogenecity) or echogeneity is the ability to bounce an echo, e.g. return the signal in medical ultrasound examinations. In other words, echogenicity is higher when the surface bouncing the sound echo reflects increased sound waves. Tissues that have higher echogenicity are called "hyperechoic" and are usually represented with lighter colors on images in medical ultrasonography. In contrast, tissues with lower echogenicity are called "hypoechoic" and are usually represented with darker colors. Areas that lack echogenicity are called "anechoic" and are usually displayed as completely dark.

== Microbubbles ==
Echogenicity can be increased by intravenously administering gas-filled microbubble contrast agent to the systemic circulation, with the procedure being called contrast-enhanced ultrasound. This is because microbubbles have a high degree of echogenicity. When gas bubbles are caught in an ultrasonic frequency field, they compress, oscillate, and reflect a characteristic echo- this generates the strong and unique sonogram in contrast-enhanced ultrasound. Gas cores can be composed of air, or heavy gases like perfluorocarbon, or nitrogen. Heavy gases are less water-soluble so they are less likely to leak out from the microbubble to impair echogenicity (McCulloch et al., 2000). Therefore, microbubbles with heavy gas cores are likely to last longer in circulation.

== Reasons for higher echogenicity ==
During ultrasound examinations, sometimes echogenicity is higher in certain parts of body. Fatty liver could cause increased echogenicity in the liver, especially if the liver transaminases are elevated.

Women with polyendocrine metabolic ovarian syndrome (PMOS) may also show an increase in stromal echogenicity.

== See also ==
- Contrast-enhanced ultrasound
- Echogenic intracardiac focus
- Medical ultrasound
