= EIF =

EIF may refer to:

== Science and medicine ==
- Echogenic intracardiac focus
- Eukaryotic initiation factor
- Exponential integrate-and-fire

== Sport ==
- Edsbyns IF, a Swedish bandy club
- Ekenäs IF, a Finnish football club
- Eskilsminne IF, Swedish football club

== Other uses ==
- Easter Island Foundation, an American conservation organization
- Eclaireurs israélites de France, a French Scouting organization
- Edinburgh International Festival, a Scottish performing arts festival
- Empirical influence function
- Enhanced integrated framework, a global development program
- Enterprise interoperability framework
- Entertainment Industry Foundation, an American entertainment industry charity
- Estonian Internet Foundation, the operator of the .ee country code top-level domain of Estonia
- European industry federation, a type of trade union
- European Internet Foundation of the European Parliament
- European Interoperability Framework
- European Investment Fund, an agency of the European Union
