= Nucleotide pyrophosphatase/phosphodiesterase =

Class of enzymes

Nucleotide pyrophosphatase/phosphodiesterase (NPP)
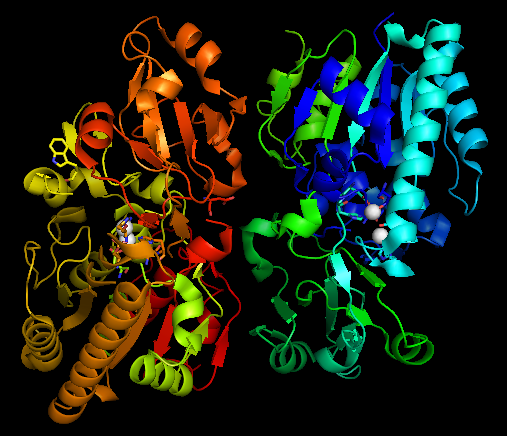
- The overall dimeric structure of NPP in Xanthomonas axonopodis pv. citri str. 306 (Xac). This enzyme relies on the catalytic ability of 2 Zn^{2+} atoms in the catalytic core, which are shown in white.

Identifiers
- EC no.: 3.6.1.9

Databases
- BRENDA: enzyme data
- ExPASy: NiceZyme view
- KEGG: enzyme entry
- MetaCyc: metabolic pathway
- Rhea: reactions
- PDB structures: RCSB PDB PDBe PDBsum
Search
- PMC: articles
- PubMed: articles
- NCBI: proteins

Nucleotide pyrophosphatase/phosphodiesterase (NPP) is a class of dimeric enzymes that catalyze the hydrolysis of phosphate diester bonds. NPP belongs to the alkaline phosphatase (AP) superfamily of enzymes. Humans express seven known NPP isoforms, some of which prefer nucleotide substrates, some of which prefer phospholipid substrates, and others of which prefer substrates that have not yet been determined. In eukaryotes, most NPPs are located in the cell membrane and hydrolyze extracellular phosphate diesters to affect a wide variety of biological processes. Bacterial NPP is thought to localize to the periplasm.

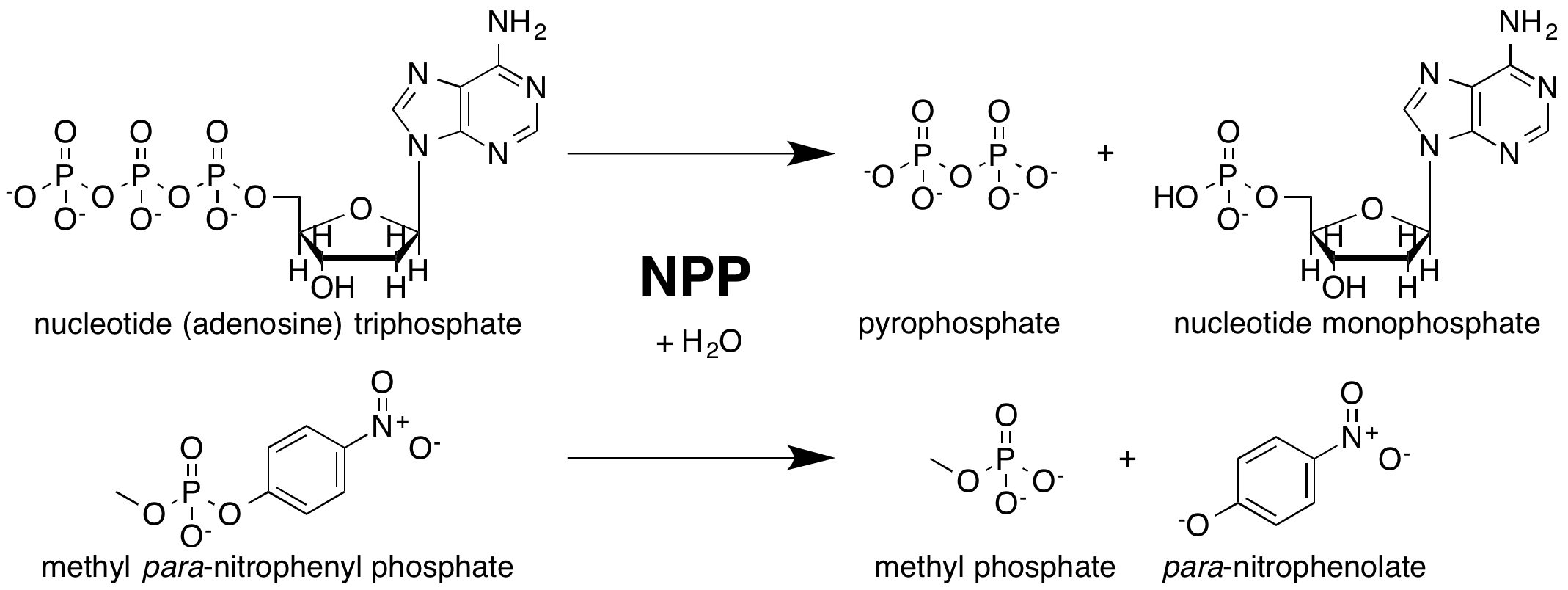
Net reaction scheme for Nucleotide Pyrophosphatase/Phosphodiesterase enzyme, showing a natural NTP substrate (ATP) and a chromophore-producing phosphodiester reagent used for activity assays (methyl para-nitrophenyl phosphate).

== Structure ==
The catalytic site of NPP consists of a two-metal-ion (bimetallo) Zn^{2+} catalytic core. These Zn^{2+} catalytic components are thought to stabilize the transition state of the NPP phosphoryl transfer reaction.

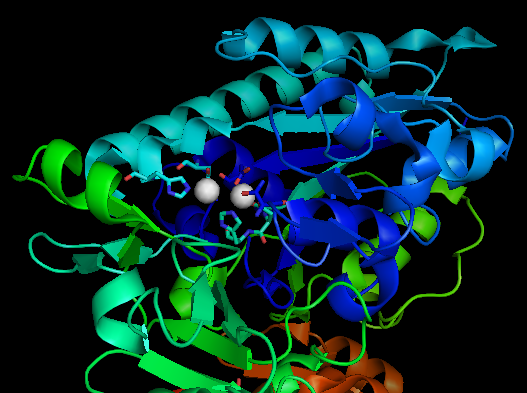
A closer view of the active site of Xac NPP, which is located on the surface of the subunit. The Zn^{2+} atoms of the bimetallo catalytic site are shown by white spheres.

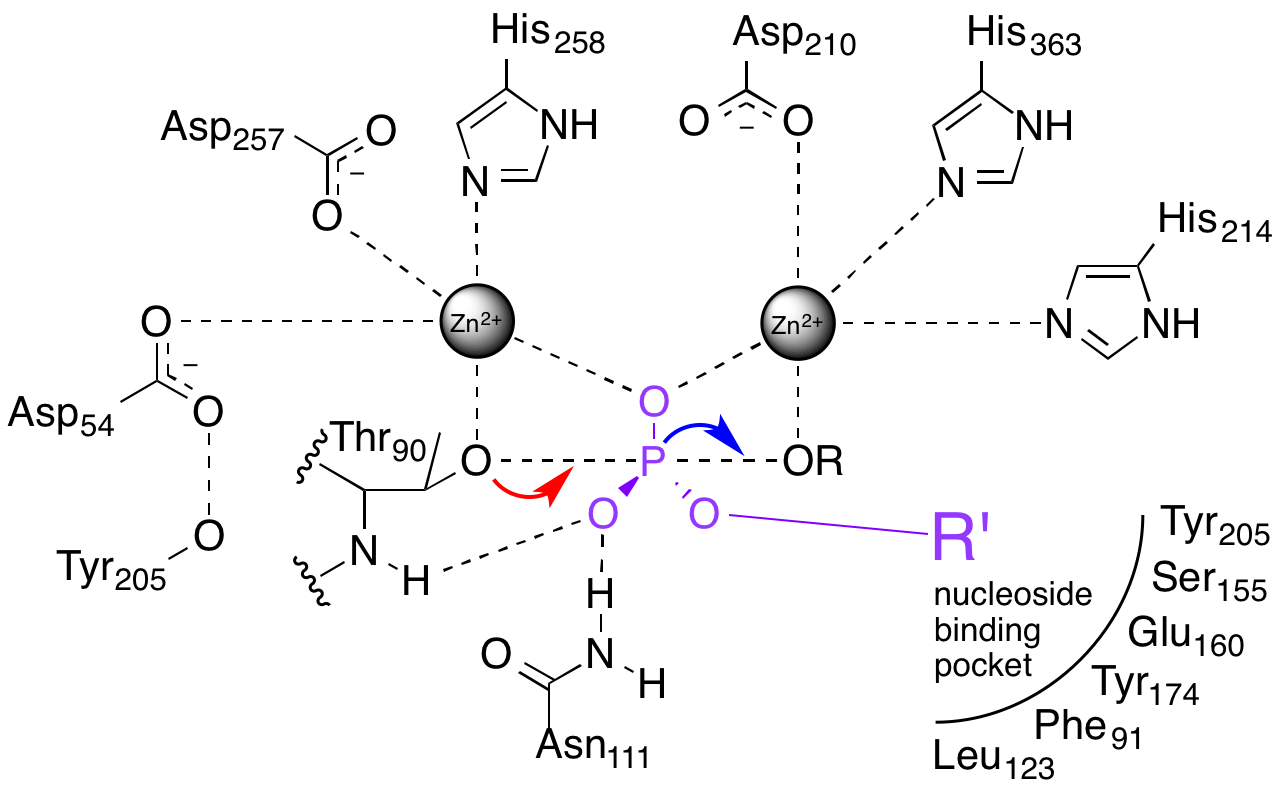
Schematic of Xac NPP active site in a transition state. Violet denotes the phosphodiester substrate. Red and blue curved arrows represent nucleophilic addition (A_{N}) and elimination (D_{N}) steps, respectively, of the phosphoryl transfer reaction. These two steps could occur in either order, and probably overlap. The active site's threonine nucleophile is regenerated via hydrolysis. Adapted from.

== Mechanism ==
=== Overview ===
NPP catalyses the nucleophilic substitution of one ester bond on a phosphodiester substrate. It has a nucleoside binding pocket that excludes phospholipid substrates from the active site. A threonine nucleophile has been identified through site-directed mutagenesis, and the reaction inverts the stereochemistry of the phosphorus center. The sequence of bond breakage and formation has yet to be resolved.

=== Ongoing Investigation ===
Three extreme possibilities have been proposed for the mechanism of NPP-catalyzed phosphoryl transfer. They are distinguished by the sequence in which bonds to phosphorus are made and broken. Though this phenomenon is subtle, it is important for understanding the physiological roles of AP superfamily enzymes, and also to molecular dynamic modeling.

Extreme mechanistic scenarios:

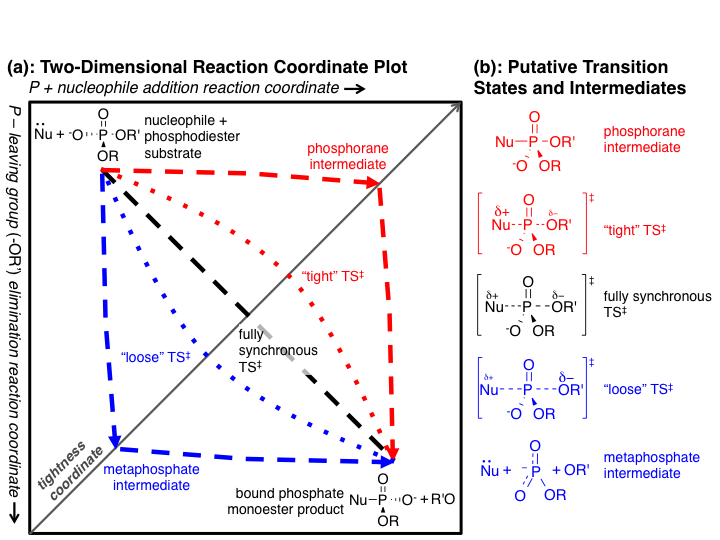
(a) A 2-dimensional reaction coordinate plot, also known as a More-O'Ferall-Jenck diagram, illustrating possible catalytic mechanisms for NPP. The x and y coordinates represent the reaction coordinates (i.e. progress) of the addition (A_{N}) and elimination (D_{N}) steps, respectively. To use the plot to visualize a potential energy surface, imagine energy of the system on an axis projecting out of the screen. The shape of the potential energy surface determines the actual mechanism of the enzyme, since the system will proceed from reactants to products along the lowest-energy path. (b) Schematics of the reaction intermediates and transition states produced by each hypothetical path plotted in (a). Note partial charges.

1) A two-step "dissociative" (elimination-addition or D_{N} + A_{N}) mechanism that proceeds via a trigonal metaphosphate intermediate. This mechanism is represented by the red dashed lines in the figure at right.

2) A two-step "associative" (addition-elimination or A_{N} + D_{N}) mechanism that proceeds via a pentavalent phosphorane intermediate. This is represented by the blue dashed lines in the figure at right.

3) A one-step fully synchronous mechanism analogous to S_{N}2 substitution. Bond formation and breakage occur simultaneously and at the same rate. This is represented by the black dashed line in the figure at right.

The above three cases represent archetypes for the reaction mechanism, and the actual mechanism probably falls somewhere in between them. The red and blue dotted lines in Fig. 2a represent more realistic "concerted" mechanisms in which addition and elimination overlap, but are not fully synchronous. The difference in initial rates of the two steps implies different charge distribution in the transition state (TS).

When the addition step occurs more quickly than elimination (an A_{N}D_{N} mechanism), more positive charge develops on the nucleophile, and the transition state is said to be "tight." Conversely, if elimination occurs more quickly than addition (D_{N}A_{N}), the transition state is considered "loose."

López-Canut et al. modeled substitution of a phosphodiester substrate using a hybrid quantum mechanics/molecular mechanics model. Notably, the model predicted an A_{N}D_{N} concerted mechanism in aqueous solution, but a D_{N}A_{N} mechanism in the active site of Xac NPP.

== Promiscuity ==
Although NPP primarily catalyzes phosphodiester hydrolysis, the enzyme will also catalyze the hydrolysis of phosphate monoesters, though to a much smaller extent. NPP preferentially hydrolyzes phosphate diesters over monoesters by factors of 10^{2}-10^{6}, depending on the identity of the diester substrate. This ability to catalyze a reaction with a secondary substrate is known as enzyme promiscuity, and may have played a role in NPP's evolutionary history.

NPP's promiscuity enables the enzyme to share substrates with alkaline phosphatase (AP), another member of the alkaline phosphate superfamily. Alkaline phosphatase primarily hydrolyzes phosphate monoester bonds, but it shows some promiscuity towards hydrolyzing phosphate diester bonds, making it a sort of opposite to NPP. The active sites of these two enzymes show marked similarities, namely in the presence of nearly superimposable Zn^{2+} bimetallo catalytic centers. In addition to the bimetallo core, AP also has an Mg^{2+} ion in its active site.

== Biological function ==
NPPs have been implicated in several biological processes, including bone mineralization, purine nucleotide and insulin signaling, and cell differentiation and motility. They are generally regulated at the transcriptional level.

=== Mammalian Isoforms ===
==== Nucleotide pyrophosphatase/phosphodiesterase I ====
NPP1 helps scavenge extracellular nucleotides in order to meet the high purine and pyrimidine requirements of dividing cells. In T-cells, it may scavenge NAD^{+} from nearby dead cells as a source of adenosine.

The pyrophosphate produced by NPP1 in bone cells is thought to serve as both a phosphate source for calcium phosphate deposition and as an inhibitory modulator of calcification. NPP1 appears to be important for maintaining pyrophosphate/phosphate balance. Overactivity of the enzyme is associated with chondrocalcinosis, while deficiency correlates to pathological calcification.

NPP1 inhibits the insulin receptor in vitro. In 2005, overexpression of the isoform was implicated in insulin resistance in mice. It has been linked to insulin resistance and Type 2 diabetes in humans.

==== NPP2 ====
NPP2, known in humans as autotaxin, acts primarily in cell motility pathways. With its active site functioning, NPP2 promotes cellular migration at picomolar concentrations. Soluble splice variants of NPP2 are thought to be important to cancer metastasis, and also show angiogenic properties in tumors.

==== NPP3 ====
NPP3 is probably a major contributor to nucleotide metabolism in the intestine and liver.

Intestinal NPP3 would be involved in hydrolyzing food-derived nucleotides.

The liver releases ATP and ADP into the bile to regulate bile secretion. It subsequently reclaims adenosine via a pathway that probably contains NPP3.

== Evolution ==
NPP belongs to the alkaline phosphatase superfamily, which is a group of evolutionarily related enzymes that catalyze phosphoryl and sulfuryl transfer reactions. This group includes phosphomonoesterases, phosphodiesterases, phosphoglycerate mutases, phosphophenomutases, and sulfatases.
