= Crown-rump length =

Ultrasound measurement of a foetus

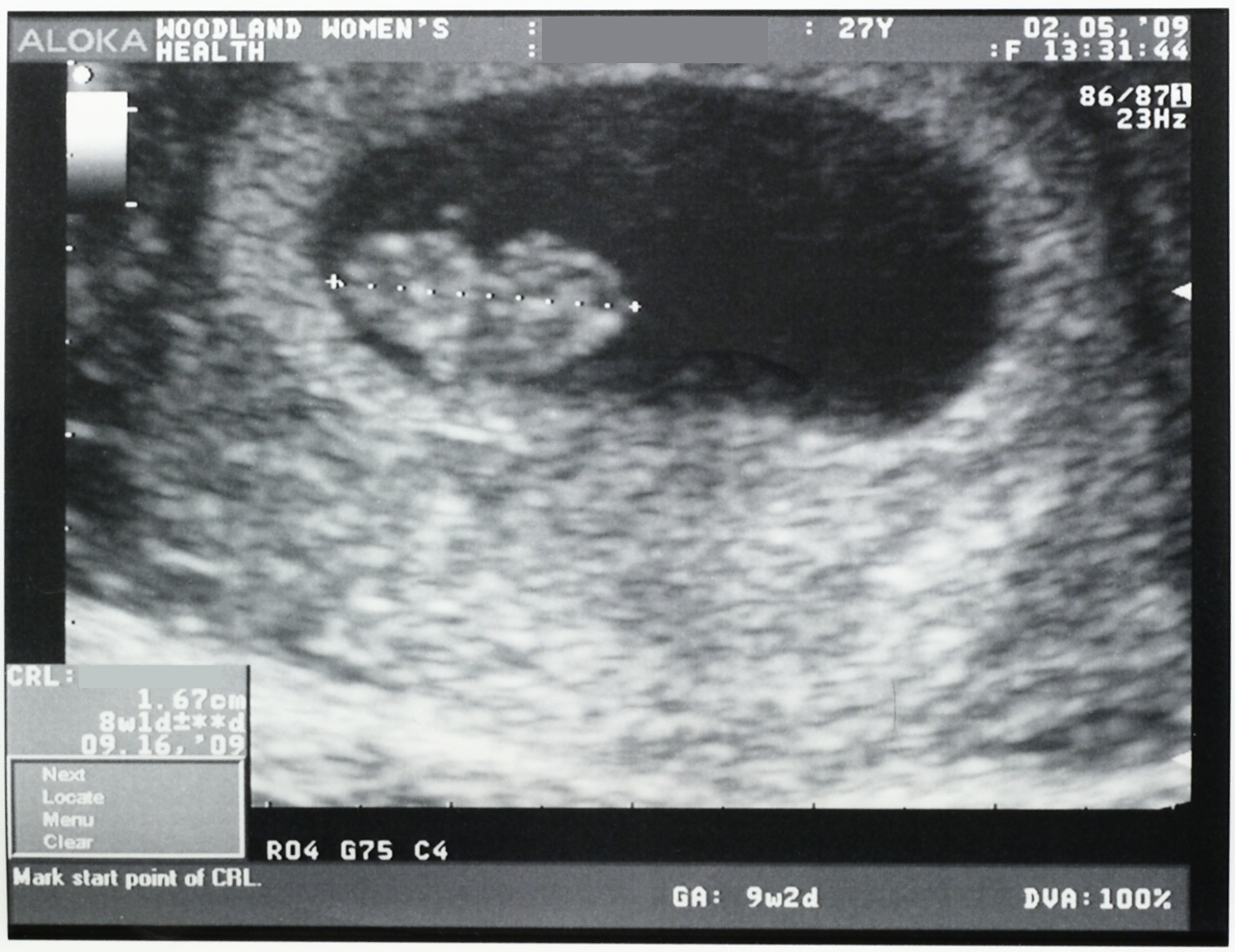
An ultrasound showing an embryo measured to have a crown-rump length of 1.67 cm and estimated to have a gestational age of 8 weeks and 1 day

Crown-rump length (CRL) is the measurement of the length of human embryos and fetuses from the top of the head (crown) to the bottom of the buttocks (rump). It is typically determined from ultrasound imagery and can be used to estimate gestational age.

== Introduction ==
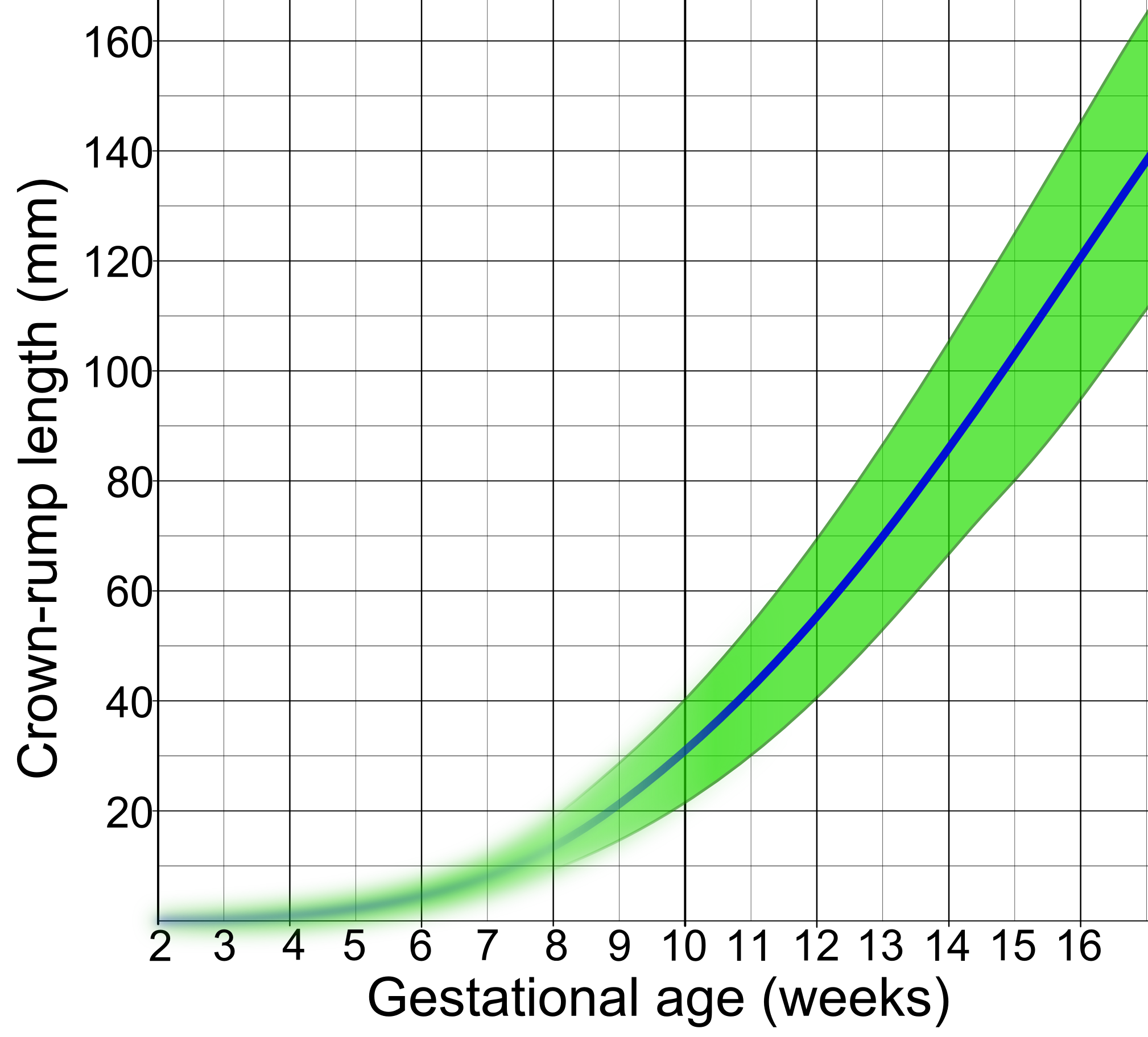
Diagram showing crown-rump length by gestational age. The blue line is the mean and the green area delimits the 3rd versus the 97th percentile.

Ultrasound image of the foetus at 12 weeks of pregnancy in a sagittal scan. Measurements of fetal Crown Rump Length (CRL).

The embryo and fetus float in the amniotic fluid inside the uterus of the mother usually in a curved posture resembling the letter C. The measurement can actually vary slightly if the fetus is temporarily stretching (straightening) its body. The measurement needs to be in the natural state with an unstretched body which is actually C shaped. The measurement of CRL is useful in determining the gestational age (menstrual age starting from the first day of the last menstrual period) and thus the expected date of delivery (EDD). Different human fetuses grow at different rates and thus the gestational age is an approximation. Recent evidence has indicated that CRL growth (and thus the approximation of gestational age) may be influenced by maternal factors such as age, smoking, and folic acid intake. Early in pregnancy gestational age 8 weeks, it is accurate within about +/- 5 days but later in pregnancy, due to different growth rates, the accuracy is lower. In that situation, other parameters can be used in addition to CRL. The length of the umbilical cord is approximately equal to the CRL throughout pregnancy.

Gestational age is not the same as fertilization age. It takes about 14 days from the first day of the last menstrual period for conception to take place and thus for the conceptus to form. The age from this point in time (conception) is called the fertilization age and is thus 2 weeks shorter than the gestational age. Thus a 6-week gestational age would be a 4-week fertilization age. Some authorities however casually interchange these terms and the reader is advised to be cautious. An average gestational period (duration of pregnancy from the first day of the last menstrual period up to delivery) is 280 days. On average, this is 9 months and 6 days.

Crown-rump length is the measurement from the top of the fetal head to the bottom of the torso and is commonly used for estimating gestational age during the first trimester. The measurement is obtained during ultrasound examination with the fetus in a neutral position, and it is particularly useful for pregnancy dating before other fetal biometric measurements become more reliable. CRL generally increases in a predictable manner during early pregnancy, allowing the measurement to be compared with established gestational-age reference ranges. Crown-rump length reference and calculator

== Gestational age estimation ==
A commonly used estimate of gestational age in weeks is (as described by Verburg et al.):

$GA_{weeks}=CRL^{0.2313}\cdot e^{1.4653+0.001737\cdot CRL}$

Crown–rump length (CRL) in relation to gestational age
CRL (mm)	Gestational age (weeks + days)		
CRL (mm)	5th centile	Median	95th centile
5	5 + 6	6 + 2	6 + 6
10	7 + 0	7 + 4	8 + 1
15	7 + 5	8 + 2	9 + 0
20	8 + 2	9 + 0	9 + 5
25	8 + 6	9 + 4	10 + 2
30	9 + 2	10 + 0	10 + 6
35	9 + 5	10 + 3	11 + 2
40	10 + 1	10 + 6	11 + 5
45	10 + 3	11 + 2	12 + 1
50	10 + 6	11 + 5	12 + 4
55	11 + 1	12 + 0	13 + 0
60	11 + 3	12 + 3	13 + 3
65	11 + 6	12 + 5	13 + 5
70	12 + 1	13 + 0	14 + 0
75	12 + 3	13 + 3	14 + 3
80	12 + 5	13 + 5	14 + 5
85	13 + 0	14 + 0	15 + 1
90	13 + 2	14 + 2	15 + 3
95	13 + 4	14 + 4	15 + 5
100	13 + 6	15 + 0	16 + 1

Gestational age estimation in days is carried out according to the equations:

$GA_{days}=40.9+3.24585\cdot CRL^{0.5}+0.348956\cdot CRL$ ; and SD of GA = 2.39102 + (0.0193474 × CRL).

== See also ==
- Obstetric ultrasonography
