= ANKH =

Protein and coding gene in humans

Identifiers
- Aliases: ANKH, ANK, CCAL2, CMDJ, CPPDD, HANK, MANK, ANKH inorganic pyrophosphate transport regulator, SLC62A1
- External IDs: OMIM: 605145; MGI: 3045421; GeneCards: ANKH

Gene location (Human)
Chr.	Chromosome 5 (human)
Band	5p15.2	Start	14,704,800 bp
Band	5p15.2	End	14,871,778 bp

Gene location (Mouse)
Chr.	Chromosome 15 (mouse)
Band	15 B1|15 10.23 cM	Start	27,466,763 bp
Band	15 B1|15 10.23 cM	End	27,594,995 bp
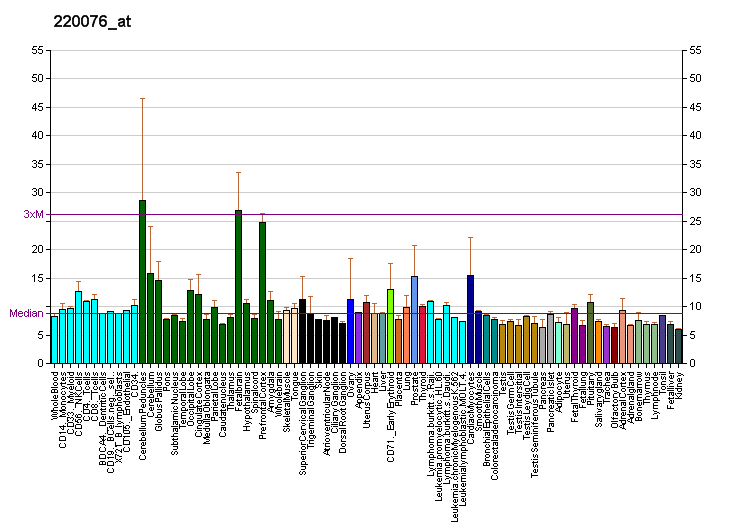
RNA expression pattern
Bgee	Human / Mouse (ortholog); Top expressed in: tibia; parotid gland; inferior ganglion of vagus nerve; pons; right ventricle; Skeletal muscle tissue of biceps brachii; subthalamic nucleus; synovial joint; superior vestibular nucleus; Skeletal muscle tissue of rectus abdominis / Top expressed in: seminal vesicula; right ventricle; digastric muscle; ankle; temporal muscle; lip; muscle of thigh; sternocleidomastoid muscle; triceps brachii muscle; deep cerebellar nuclei; More reference expression data
BioGPS	More reference expression data
Gene ontology
Molecular function	phosphate ion transmembrane transporter activity; inorganic phosphate transmembrane transporter activity; inorganic diphosphate transmembrane transporter activity
Cellular component	membrane; outer membrane; integral component of membrane; integral component of plasma membrane; plasma membrane
Biological process	skeletal system development; transmembrane transport; locomotory behavior; phosphate ion transport; phosphate ion transmembrane transport; regulation of bone mineralization; inorganic diphosphate transport
Sources:Amigo / QuickGO
Orthologs
Databases	NCBI: entry; OMA: entry
Species	Human	Mouse
Entrez	56172	11732
Ensembl	ENSG00000154122	ENSMUSG00000022265
UniProt	Q9HCJ1	Q9JHZ2
RefSeq (mRNA)	NM_054027	NM_020332
RefSeq (protein)	NP_473368	NP_065065
Location (UCSC)	Chr 5: 14.7 – 14.87 Mb	Chr 15: 27.47 – 27.59 Mb
PubMed search
- Wikidata
View/Edit Human	View/Edit Mouse

Progressive ankylosis protein homolog (ANK ilosis H omolog) is a protein that in humans is encoded by the ANKH gene. ANKH is a multipass transmembrane protein that is expressed in joints and other tissues. It is involved in transport of pyrophosphate (an inhibitor of hydroxyapatite precipitation) from cells into the extracellular space. It is expressed in osteoblasts. Deficiencies of ANKH are associated with excessive calcification of bone and with metastatic calcification.

== Research ==
In a mouse model, mutation at the Ank locus causes a generalized, progressive form of arthritis accompanied by mineral deposition, formation of bony outgrowths, and joint destruction. The human homolog is virtually identical to the mouse protein and ANKH-mediated control of pyrophosphate levels has been suggested as a possible mechanism regulating tissue calcification and susceptibility to arthritis in higher animals.
