= Ectonucleotide pyrophosphatase/phosphodiesterase 1 =

Enzyme

ENPP1

Identifiers
- Aliases: ENPP1, ARHR2, COLED, M6S1, NPP1, NPPS, PC-1, PCA1, PDNP1, Ectonucleotide pyrophosphatase/phosphodiesterase 1, CD203a
- External IDs: OMIM: 173335; MGI: 97370; GeneCards: ENPP1
Available structures
PDB	Ortholog search: PDBe RCSB
PDB	List of PDB id codes 2YS0
Enzyme activity
EC #	BRENDA	ExPASy	KEGG	MetaCyc
3.1.4.1	↗	↗	↗	↗
3.6.1.9	↗	↗	↗	↗

Gene location (Human)
Chr.	Chromosome 6 (human)
Band	6q23.2	Start	131,808,016 bp
Band	6q23.2	End	131,895,155 bp

Gene location (Mouse)
Chr.	Chromosome 10 (mouse)
Band	10 A4|10 12.26 cM	Start	24,513,812 bp
Band	10 A4|10 12.26 cM	End	24,588,057 bp
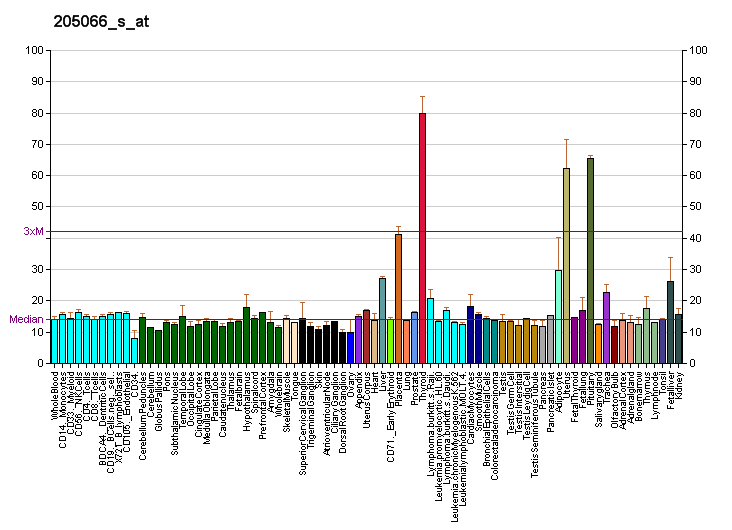

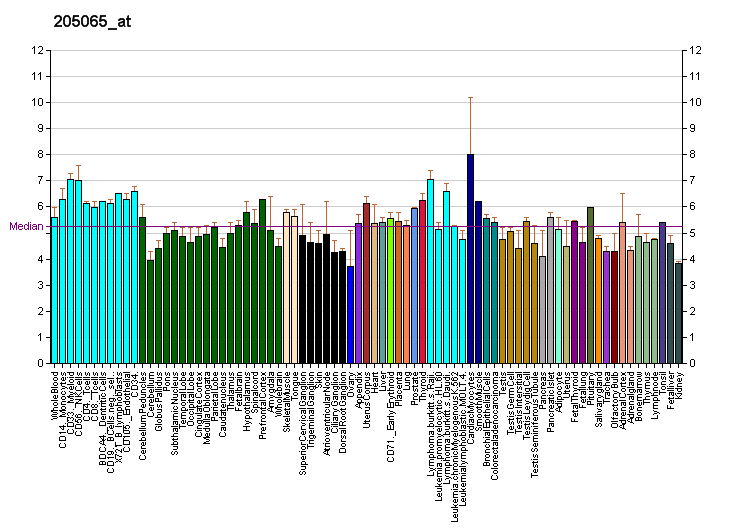
RNA expression pattern
Bgee	Human / Mouse (ortholog); Top expressed in: tibia; decidua; cartilage tissue; tail of epididymis; Achilles tendon; tendon of biceps brachii; liver; right lobe of liver; synovial joint; corpus epididymis / Top expressed in: epithelium of lens; fossa; condyle; transitional epithelium of urinary bladder; body of femur; right kidney; ankle; umbilical cord; ascending aorta; aortic valve; More reference expression data
BioGPS	More reference expression data
Gene ontology
Molecular function	nucleoside-triphosphate diphosphatase activity; calcium ion binding; nucleotide diphosphatase activity; protein homodimerization activity; insulin receptor binding; zinc ion binding; polysaccharide binding; 3'-phosphoadenosine 5'-phosphosulfate binding; metal ion binding; scavenger receptor activity; NADH pyrophosphatase activity; protein binding; catalytic activity; nucleic acid binding; hydrolase activity; ATP binding; phosphodiesterase I activity; exonuclease activity; cyclic-GMP-AMP hydrolase activity
Cellular component	integral component of membrane; membrane; plasma membrane; integral component of plasma membrane; extracellular region; cell surface; lysosomal membrane; basolateral plasma membrane; extracellular space
Biological process	negative regulation of fat cell differentiation; negative regulation of protein autophosphorylation; regulation of bone mineralization; riboflavin metabolic process; biomineral tissue development; nucleoside triphosphate catabolic process; cellular phosphate ion homeostasis; negative regulation of glycogen biosynthetic process; receptor-mediated endocytosis; generation of precursor metabolites and energy; 3'-phosphoadenosine 5'-phosphosulfate metabolic process; negative regulation of glucose import; negative regulation of insulin receptor signaling pathway; negative regulation of cell growth; immune response; cellular response to insulin stimulus; phosphate-containing compound metabolic process; metabolism; inorganic diphosphate transport; sequestering of triglyceride; ATP metabolic process; nucleic acid phosphodiester bond hydrolysis; vesicle-mediated transport; melanocyte differentiation; negative regulation of bone mineralization; negative regulation of hh target transcription factor activity; endocytosis
Sources:Amigo / QuickGO
Orthologs
Databases	NCBI: entry; OMA: entry
Species	Human	Mouse
Entrez	5167	18605
Ensembl	ENSG00000197594	ENSMUSG00000037370
UniProt	P22413	P06802
RefSeq (mRNA)	NM_006208	NM_008813; NM_001308327; NM_001308329
RefSeq (protein)	NP_006199	NP_001295256; NP_001295258; NP_032839
Location (UCSC)	Chr 6: 131.81 – 131.9 Mb	Chr 10: 24.51 – 24.59 Mb
PubMed search
- Wikidata
View/Edit Human	View/Edit Mouse

Ectonucleotide pyrophosphatase/phosphodiesterase family member 1 (PC-1, CD203a) is an enzyme that in humans is encoded by the ENPP1 gene.

== Structure ==
This gene is a member of the ecto-nucleotide pyrophosphatase/phosphodiesterase (ENPP) family. The encoded protein is a type II transmembrane glycoprotein comprising two identical disulfide-bonded subunits.

== Function ==
The main substrate of ENPP1 is adenosine triphosphate (ATP), which is cleaved into adenosine monophosphate (AMP) and diphosphate. Other notable substrates include cyclic guanosine monophosphate-adenosine monophosphate (cGAMP), nicotinamide adenine dinucleotide (NAD+) and cADPR.

ENPP3, a paralog of ENPP1, has also been identified as a major extracellular cGAMP hydrolase and is the second metazoan enzyme known to perform this function.

== Clinical significance ==
Mutations in this gene have been associated with Generalized arterial calcification of infancy, ossification of the posterior longitudinal ligament of the spine (OPLL), Hypophosphatemic rickets autosomal recessive 2 (ARHR2), and insulin resistance.

In a tumor microenvironment, AMP generated by ENPP1 can lead to production of adenosine, which suppresses the anti-cancer function of the immune system.

== Interactions ==
Ectonucleotide pyrophosphatase/phosphodiesterase 1 has been shown to interact with Insulin receptor.

== See also ==
- Nucleotide pyrophosphatase/phosphodiesterase
