= Gestational age =

Measure of the age of a pregnancy

In obstetrics, gestational age is a measure of the age of a pregnancy taken from the beginning of the woman's last menstrual period (LMP), or the corresponding age of the gestation as estimated by a more accurate method, if available. Such methods include adding 14 days to a known duration since fertilization (as is possible in in vitro fertilization), or by obstetric ultrasonography. The popularity of using this measure of pregnancy is largely due to convenience: menstruation is usually noticed, while there is generally no convenient way to discern when fertilization or implantation occurred.

Gestational age is contrasted with fertilization age, which takes the date of fertilization as the start date of gestation. There are different approaches to defining the start of a pregnancy. The definition of pregnancy and the calculation of gestational age are also relevant in the context of the abortion debate and the philosophical debate over the beginning of human personhood.

== Methods ==
According to the American College of Obstetricians and Gynecologists, the main methods to calculate gestational age are:

- Directly calculating the days since the beginning of the last menstrual period
- Early obstetric ultrasound, comparing the size of an embryo or fetus to that of a reference group of pregnancies of known gestational age (such as calculated from last menstrual periods) and using the mean gestational age of other embryos or fetuses of the same size. If the gestational age as calculated from an early ultrasound is contradictory to the one calculated directly from the last menstrual period, it is still the one from the early ultrasound that is used for the rest of the pregnancy.
- In case of in vitro fertilization, calculating days since oocyte retrieval or co-incubation and adding 14 days.

Gestational age can also be estimated by calculating days from ovulation if it was estimated from related signs or ovulation tests, and adding 14 days by convention.

A more complete listing of methods is given in following table:

Method of estimating gestational age	Variability (2 standard deviations)
Days from oocyte retrieval or co-incubation in in vitro fertilisation + 14 days	±1 day
Days from estimated ovulation in ovulation induction + 14 days	±3 days
Days from artificial insemination + 14 days	±3 days
Days from known single sexual intercourse + 14 days	±3 days
Days from estimated ovulation by basal body temperature record + 14 days	±4 days
First-trimester physical examination	±2 weeks
Second-trimester physical examination	±4 weeks
Third-trimester physical examination	±6 weeks
First-trimester obstetric ultrasonography (crown-rump length)	±8% of the estimate
Second-trimester obstetric ultrasonography (head circumference, femur length)	±8% of the estimate
Third-trimester obstetric ultrasonography (head circumference, femur length)	±8% of the estimate

As a general rule, the official gestational age should be based on the actual beginning of the last menstrual period, unless any of the above methods gives an estimated date that differs more than the variability for the method, in which case the difference cannot probably be explained by that variability alone. For example, if there is a gestational age based on the beginning of the last menstrual period of 9.0 weeks, and a first-trimester obstetric ultrasonography gives an estimated gestational age of 10.0 weeks (with a 2 SD variability of ±8% of the estimate, thereby giving a variability of ±0.8 weeks), the difference of 1.0 weeks between the tests is larger than the 2 SD variability of the ultrasonography estimate, indicating that the gestational age estimated by ultrasonography should be used as the official gestational age.

Once the estimated due date (EDD) is established, it should rarely be changed, as the determination of gestational age is most accurate earlier in the pregnancy.

Assessment of gestational age can be made based on selected head and trunk parameters. Following are diagrams for estimating gestational age from obstetric ultrasound, by various target parameters:

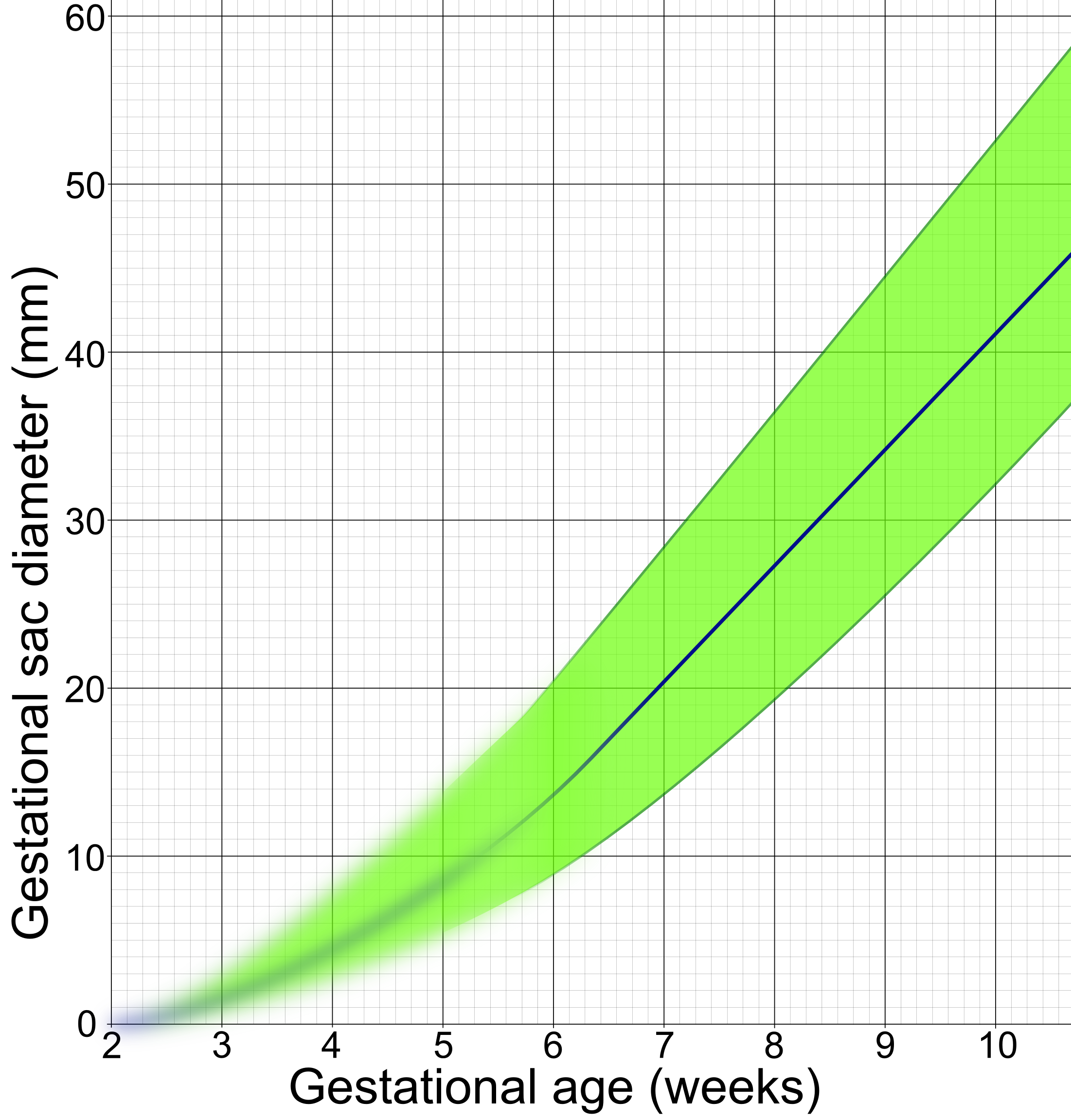
By gestational sac diameter

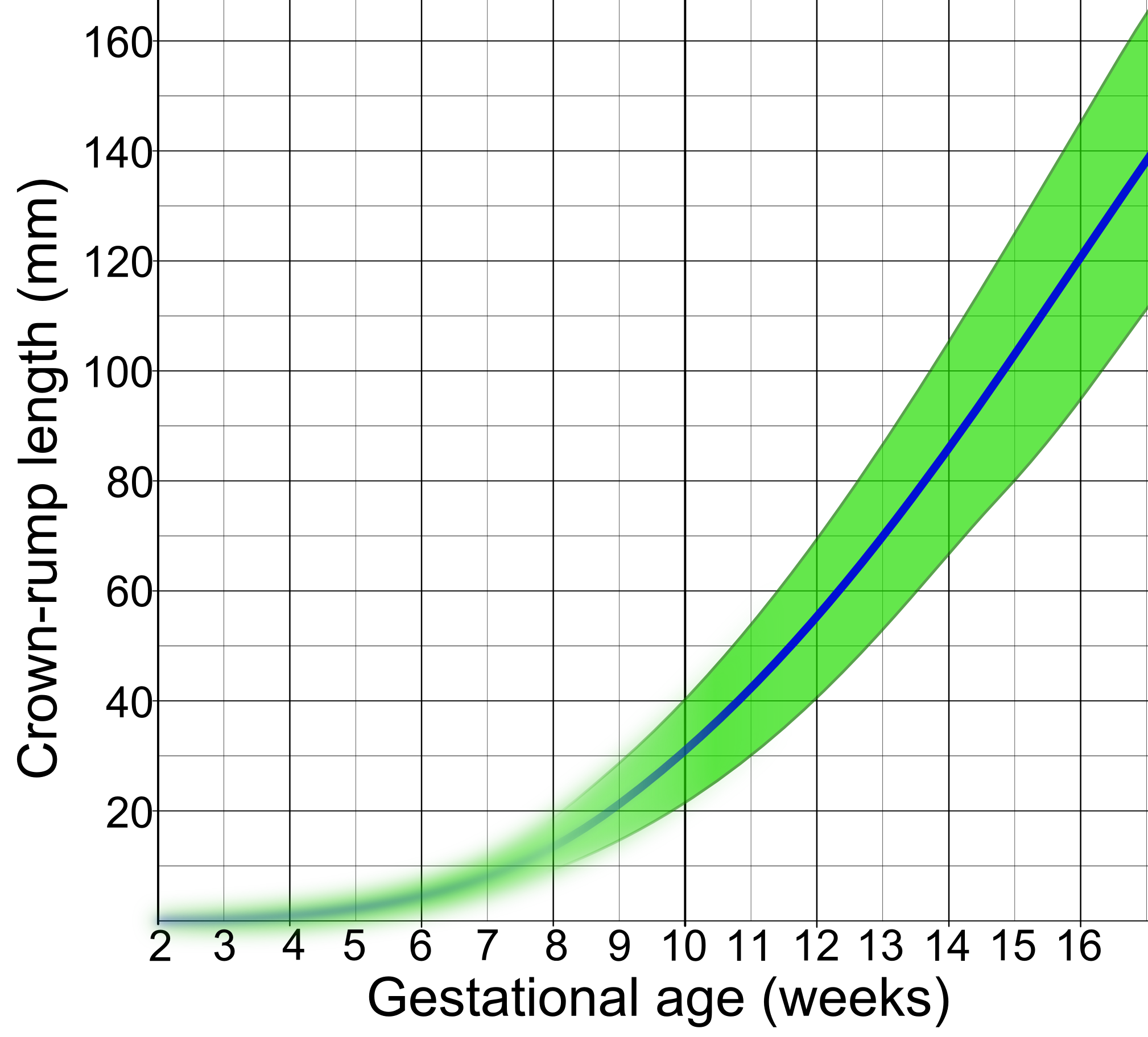
By crown-rump length (CRL)

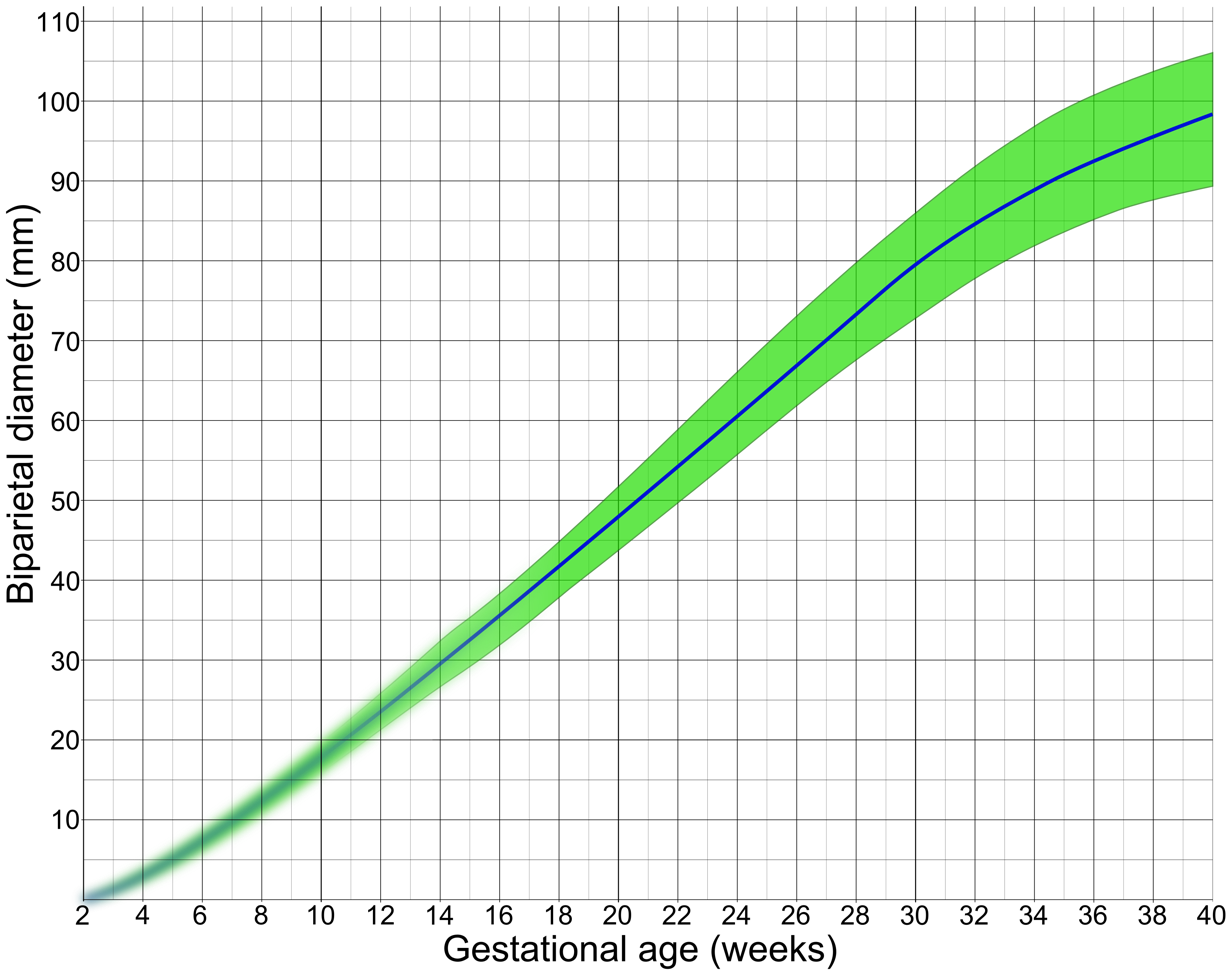
By biparietal diameter (BPD)

== Comparison to fertilization age ==
The fertilization or conceptional age (also called embryonic age and later fetal age) is the time from the fertilization. It usually occurs within a day of ovulation, which, in turn, occurs on average 14.6 days after the beginning of the preceding menstruation (LMP).

There is also considerable variability in this interval, with a 95% prediction interval of the ovulation of 9 to 20 days after menstruation even for an average woman who has a mean LMP-to-ovulation time of 14.6. In a reference group representing all women, the 95% prediction interval of the LMP-to-ovulation is 8.2 to 20.5 days. The actual variability between gestational age as estimated from the beginning of the last menstrual period (without the use of any additional method mentioned in previous section) is substantially larger because of uncertainty which menstrual cycle gave rise to the pregnancy. For example, the menstruation may be scarce enough to give the false appearance that an earlier menstruation gave rise to the pregnancy, potentially giving an estimated gestational age that is approximately one month too large. Also, vaginal bleeding occurs during 15–25% of first trimester pregnancies, and may be mistaken as menstruation, potentially giving an estimated gestational age that is too low.

Comparison of dating systems for a typical pregnancy
Event	Gestational age (from the start of the last menstrual period)	Fertilization age	Implantation age
Menstrual period begins	Day 1 of pregnancy	Not pregnant	Not pregnant
Has sex and ovulates	2 weeks pregnant	Not pregnant	Not pregnant
Fertilization; cleavage stage begins	Day 15	Day 1	Not pregnant
Implantation of blastocyst begins	Day 20	Day 6	Day 0
Implantation finished	Day 26	Day 12	Day 6 (or Day 0)
Embryo stage begins; first missed period	4 weeks	Day 15	Day 9
Primitive heart function can be detected	5 weeks, 5 days	Day 26	Day 20
Fetal stage begins	10 weeks, 1 day	8 weeks, 1 day	7 weeks, 2 days
First trimester ends	13 weeks	11 weeks	10 weeks
Second trimester ends	26 weeks	24 weeks	23 weeks
Childbirth	39–40 weeks	37–38 weeks	36–37 weeks

== Uses ==
Gestational age is used for example for:

- The events of prenatal development, which usually occur at specific gestational ages. Hence, the gestational timing of a fetal toxin exposure, fetal drug exposure or vertically transmitted infection can be used to predict the potential consequences to the fetus.
- Estimated date of delivery
- Scheduling prenatal care
- Estimation of fetal viability
- Calculating the results of various prenatal tests, (for example, in the triple test).
- Birth classification into for example preterm, term or postterm.
- Classification of infant deaths and stillbirths
- Postnatally (after birth) to estimate various risk factors

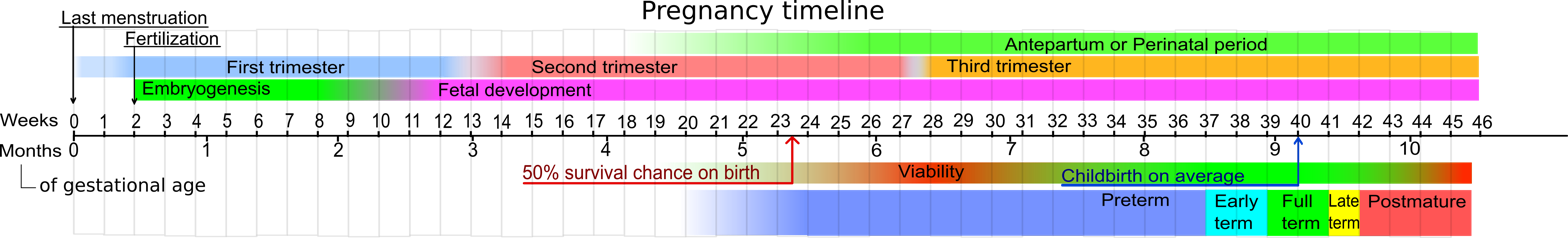
Timeline of pregnancy by gestational age

=== Estimation of due date ===
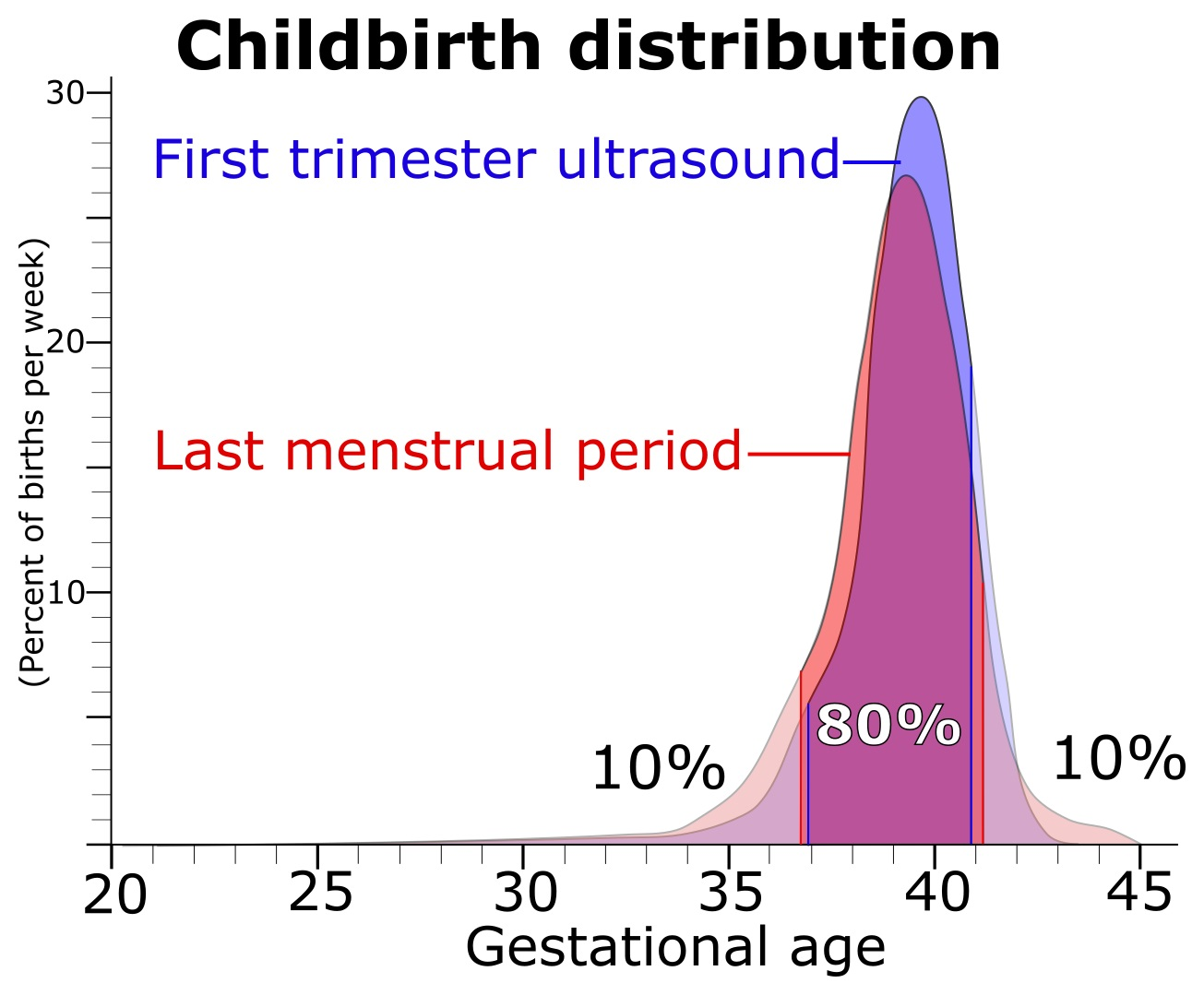
Distribution of gestational age at childbirth among singleton live births, given both when gestational age is estimated by first trimester ultrasound and directly by last menstrual period

The mean pregnancy length has been estimated to be 283.4 days of gestational age as timed from the first day of the last menstrual period and 280.6 days when retrospectively estimated by obstetric ultrasound measurement of the fetal biparietal diameter (BPD) in the second trimester. Other algorithms take into account other variables, such as whether this is the first or subsequent child, the mother's race, age, length of menstrual cycle, and menstrual regularity. In order to have a standard reference point, the normal pregnancy duration is assumed by medical professionals to be 280 days (or 40 weeks) of gestational age. Furthermore, actual childbirth has only a certain probability of occurring within the limits of the estimated due date. A study of singleton live births determined that childbirth has a standard deviation of 14 days when gestational age is estimated by first-trimester ultrasound and 16 days when estimated directly by last menstrual period.

The most common system used among healthcare professionals is Naegele's rule, which estimates the expected date of delivery (EDD) by adding a year, subtracting three months, and adding seven days to the first day of a woman's last menstrual period (LMP) or corresponding date as estimated from other means.

=== Medical fetal viability ===
There is no sharp limit of development, gestational age, or weight at which a human fetus automatically becomes viable. According to studies between 2003 and 2005, 20 to 35 percent of babies born at 23 weeks of gestation survive, while 50 to 70 percent of babies born at 24 to 25 weeks, and more than 90 percent born at 26 to 27 weeks, survive. It is rare for a baby weighing less than 500 g (17.6 ounces) to survive. A baby's chances for survival increases 3–4% per day between 23 and 24 weeks of gestation and about 2–3% per day between 24 and 26 weeks of gestation. After 26 weeks the rate of survival increases at a much slower rate because survival is high already. Prognosis depends also on medical protocols on whether to resuscitate and aggressively treat a very premature newborn, or whether to provide only palliative care, in view of the high risk of severe disability of very preterm babies.

Stages in prenatal development, showing viability and point of 50% chance of survival (limit of viability) at bottom. Weeks and months numbered by gestation.

Completed weeks of gestation at birth	21 and less	22	23	24	25	26	27	30	34
Chance of survival	<1%	0–10%	10–35%	40–70%	50–80%	80–90%	>90%	>95%	>98%

=== Birth classification ===
Using gestational age, births can be classified into broad categories:

Gestational Age in Weeks	Classification
< 37 0/7	Preterm
34 0/7 - 36 6/7	Late preterm
37 0/7 - 38 6/7	Early Term
39 0/7 - 40 6/7	Full Term
41 0/7 - 41 6/7	Late Term
> 42 0/7	Postterm

Using the LMP (last menstrual period) method, a full-term human pregnancy is considered to be 40 weeks (280 days), though pregnancy lengths between 38 and 42 weeks are considered normal. A fetus born prior to the 37th week of gestation is considered to be preterm. A preterm baby is likely to be premature and consequently faces increased risk of morbidity and mortality. An estimated due date is given by Naegele's rule.

According to the WHO, a preterm birth is defined as "babies born alive before 37 weeks of pregnancy are completed." According to this classification, there are three sub-categories of preterm birth, based on gestational age: extremely preterm (fewer than 28 weeks), very preterm (28 to 32 weeks), moderate to late preterm (32 to 37 weeks). Various jurisdictions may use different classifications.

=== In classifying perinatal deaths, stillbirths and infant deaths ===
For most of the 20th century, official definitions of a live birth and infant death in the Soviet Union and Russia differed from common international standards, such as those established by the World Health Organization in the latter part of the century. Babies who were fewer than 28 weeks of gestational age, or weighed fewer than 1000 grams, or fewer than 35 cm in length – even if they showed some sign of life (breathing, heartbeat, voluntary muscle movement) – were classified as "live fetuses" rather than "live births." Only if such newborns survived seven days (168 hours) were they then classified as live births. If, however, they died within that interval, they were classified as stillbirths. If they survived that interval but died within the first 365 days they were classified as infant deaths.

More recently, thresholds for "fetal death" continue to vary widely internationally, sometimes incorporating weight as well as gestational age. The gestational age for statistical recording of fetal deaths ranges from 16 weeks in Norway, to 20 weeks in the US and Australia, 24 weeks in the UK, and 26 weeks in Italy and Spain.

The WHO defines the perinatal period as "The perinatal period commences at 22 completed weeks (154 days) of gestation and ends seven completed days after birth." Perinatal mortality is the death of fetuses or neonates during the perinatal period. A 2013 study found that "While only a small proportion of births occur before 24 completed weeks of gestation (about 1 per 1000), survival is rare and most of them are either fetal deaths or live births followed by a neonatal death."

=== Postnatal use ===
Gestational age (as well as fertilization age) is sometimes used postnatally (after birth) to estimate various risk factors. For example, it is a better predictor than postnatal age for risk of intraventricular hemorrhage in premature babies treated with extracorporeal membrane oxygenation.

== Factors affecting pregnancy length ==
Child's gestational age at birth (pregnancy length) is associated with various likely causal maternal non-genetic factors: stress during pregnancy, age, parity, smoking, infection and inflammation, BMI. Also, preexisting maternal medical conditions with genetic component, e.g., diabetes mellitus type 1, systemic lupus erythematosus, anaemia. Parental ancestral background (race) also plays a role in pregnancy duration. Gestational age at birth is on average shortened by various pregnancy aspects: twin pregnancy, prelabor rupture of (fetal) membranes, pre-eclampsia, eclampsia, intrauterine growth restriction. The ratio between fetal growth rate and uterine size (reflecting uterine distension) is suspected to partially determine the pregnancy length.

== Heritability of pregnancy length ==
Family-based studies showed that gestational age at birth is partially (25–40%) determined by genetic factors.

== See also ==
- Pregnancy
- Maternity
- Prenatal development
- Gestation periods in mammals
- Abortion law
- Reproductive rights
- Fetal rights
