= Pyrophosphate =

Class of chemical compounds

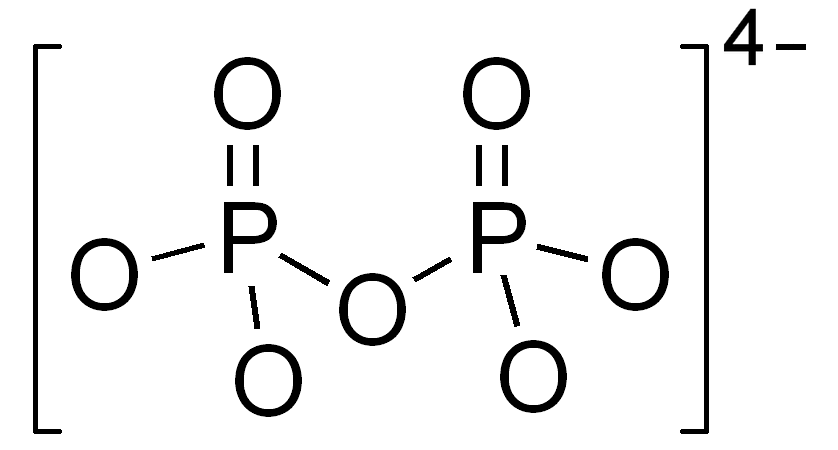

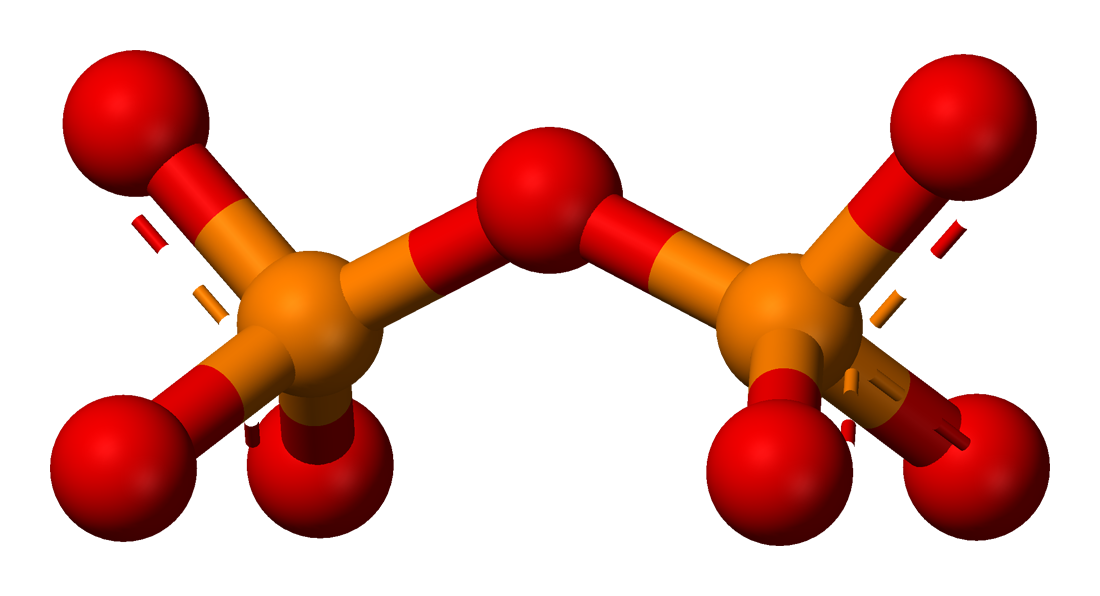
- Pyrophosphate anion Phosphorus, P Oxygen, O

Names
- IUPAC name Diphosphate
- Systematic IUPAC name Dipolyphosphate
- Other names Pyrophosphate; Phosphonatophosphate

Identifiers
CAS Number	14000-31-8; 13472-36-1 (tetrasodium decahydrate salt); 7758-16-9 (disodium salt)
3D model (JSmol)	Interactive image
ChEBI	CHEBI:18361
ChemSpider	559142
DrugBank	DB04160
E number	E450 (thickeners, ...)
Gmelin Reference	26938
PubChem CID	644102
UNII	X3SSV2V6L3
- InChI: InChI=1S/H4O7P2/c1-8(2,3)7-9(4,5)6/h(H2,1,2,3)(H2,4,5,6)/p-4 Key: XPPKVPWEQAFLFU-UHFFFAOYSA-J; InChI=1/H4O7P2/c1-8(2,3)7-9(4,5)6/h(H2,1,2,3)(H2,4,5,6)/p-4 Key: XPPKVPWEQAFLFU-XBHQNQODAI
- SMILES: [O-]P(=O)([O-])OP(=O)([O-])[O-]

Properties
Chemical formula	P_{2}O_{7}^{4−}
Molar mass	173.941 g·mol^{−1}
Conjugate acid	Pyrophosphoric acid
- Except where otherwise noted, data are given for materials in their standard state (at 25 °C [77 °F], 100 kPa). verify (what is ?) Infobox references

In chemistry, pyrophosphates are phosphorus oxyanions that contain two phosphorus atoms in a P−O−P linkage. A number of pyrophosphate salts exist, such as disodium pyrophosphate (Na_{2}H_{2}P_{2}O_{7}) and tetrasodium pyrophosphate (Na_{4}P_{2}O_{7}), among others. Often pyrophosphates are called diphosphates. The parent pyrophosphates are derived from partial or complete neutralization of pyrophosphoric acid. The pyrophosphate bond is also sometimes referred to as a phosphoanhydride bond, a naming convention which emphasizes the loss of water that occurs when two phosphates form a new P−O−P bond, and which mirrors the nomenclature for anhydrides of carboxylic acids. Pyrophosphates are found in ATP and other nucleotide triphosphates, which are important in biochemistry. The term pyrophosphate is also the name of esters formed by the condensation of a phosphorylated biological compound with inorganic phosphate, as for dimethylallyl pyrophosphate. This bond is also referred to as a high-energy phosphate bond.

== Acidity ==
Pyrophosphoric acid is a tetraprotic acid, with four distinct pK_{a}s:

H_{4}P_{2}O_{7} ⇌ H_{3}P_{2}O_{7}^{−} + H^{+}	pK_{a1} = 0.85
H_{3}P_{2}O_{7}^{−} ⇌ H_{2}P_{2}O_{7}^{2−} + H^{+}	pK_{a2} = 1.96
H_{2}P_{2}O_{7}^{2−} ⇌ HP_{2}O_{7}^{3−} + H^{+}	pK_{a3} = 6.60
HP_{2}O_{7}^{3−} ⇌ P_{2}O_{7}^{4−} + H^{+}	pK_{a4} = 9.41

The pK_{a}s occur in two distinct ranges because deprotonations occur on separate phosphate groups. For comparison, the pK_{a}s for phosphoric acid are 2.14, 7.20, and 12.37.

At physiological pHs, pyrophosphate exists as a mixture of doubly and singly protonated forms.

== Preparation ==
Disodium pyrophosphate is prepared by thermal condensation of sodium dihydrogen phosphate or by partial deprotonation of pyrophosphoric acid.

Pyrophosphates are generally white or colorless. The alkali metal salts are water-soluble. They are good complexing agents for metal ions (such as calcium and many transition metals) and have many uses in industrial chemistry. Pyrophosphate is the first member of an entire series of polyphosphates.

== Biochemistry ==
The anion P_{2}O_{7}^{4−} is abbreviated PP_{i}, standing for inorganic pyrophosphate. It is formed by the hydrolysis of ATP into AMP in cells.

ATP → AMP + PP_{i}

For example, when a nucleotide is incorporated into a growing DNA or RNA strand by a polymerase, pyrophosphate (PP_{i}) is released. Pyrophosphorolysis is the reverse of the polymerization reaction in which pyrophosphate reacts with the 3′-nucleosidemonophosphate (NMP or dNMP), which is removed from the oligonucleotide to release the corresponding triphosphate (dNTP from DNA, or NTP from RNA).

The pyrophosphate anion has the formula P_{2}O_{7}^{4−} and is an acid anhydride of phosphate. It is unstable in aqueous solution and hydrolyzes into inorganic phosphate:

P_{2}O_{7}^{4−} + H_{2}O → 2 HPO_{4}^{2−}

or in biologists' shorthand notation:

PP_{i} + H_{2}O → 2 P_{i} + 2 H^{+}

In the absence of enzymic catalysis, hydrolysis reactions of simple polyphosphates such as pyrophosphate, linear triphosphate, ADP, and ATP normally proceed extremely slowly in all but highly acidic media.

(The reverse of this reaction is a method of preparing pyrophosphates by heating phosphates.)

This hydrolysis to inorganic phosphate effectively renders the cleavage of ATP to AMP and PP_{i} irreversible, and biochemical reactions coupled to this hydrolysis are irreversible as well.

From the standpoint of high energy phosphate accounting, the hydrolysis of ATP to AMP and PP_{i} requires two high-energy phosphates, as to reconstitute AMP into ATP requires two phosphorylation reactions.

AMP + ATP → 2 ADP
2 ADP + 2 P_{i} → 2 ATP

The plasma concentration of inorganic pyrophosphate has a reference range of 0.58–3.78 μM (95% prediction interval).

=== Terpenes ===
Isopentenyl pyrophosphate converts to geranyl pyrophosphate, the precursor to tens of thousands of terpenes and terpenoids.

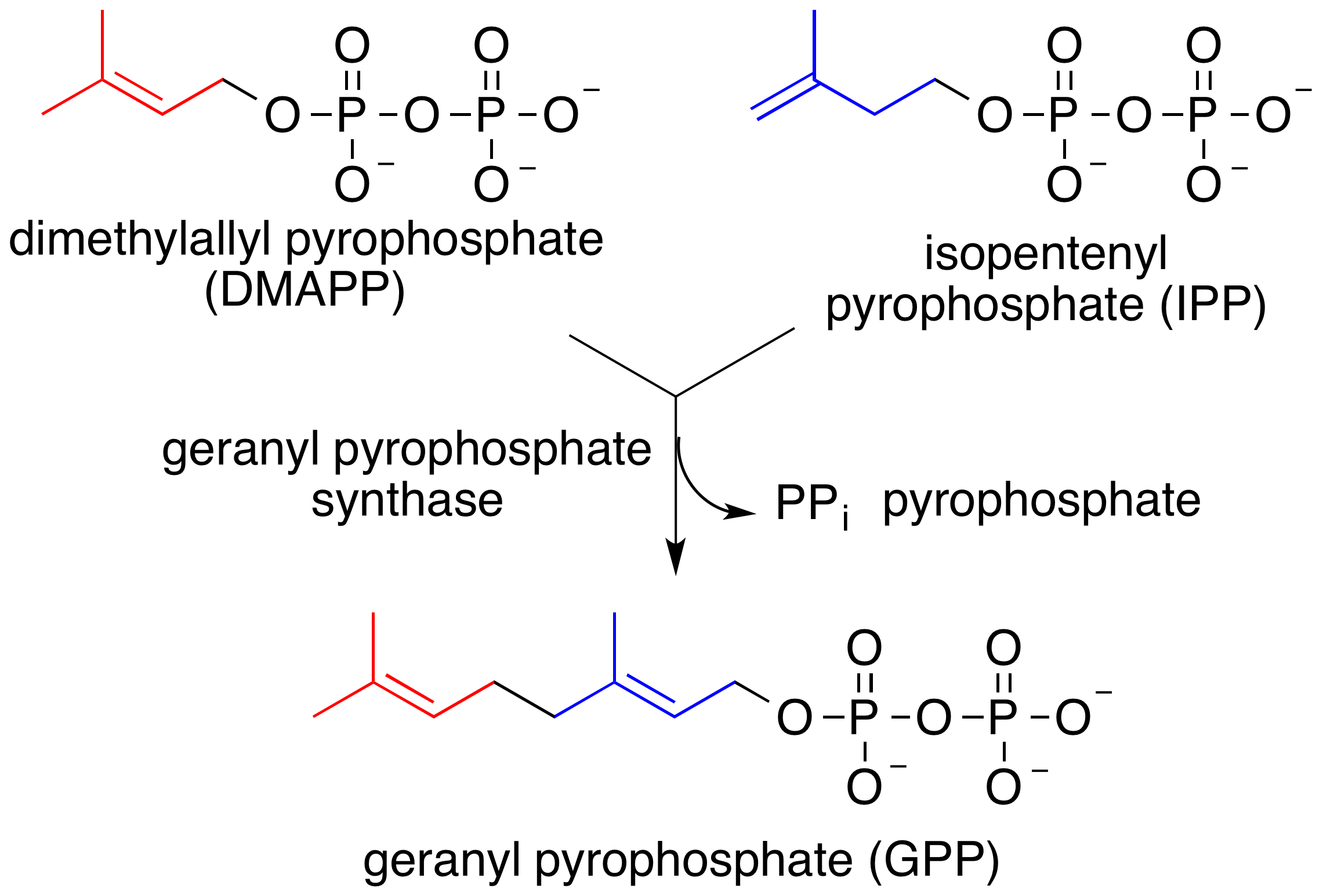
Isopentenyl pyrophosphate (IPP) and dimethylallyl pyrophosphate (DMAPP) condense to produce geranyl pyrophosphate, precursor to all terpenes and terpenoids.

== Physiological role ==
=== Hydroxyapatite precipitation inhibitor ===
PP_{i} is an important inhibitor of hydroxyapatite precipitation present in extracellular fluid (ECF) (including blood plasma, synovial fluid, and urine.). ECF is supersaturated in Ca^{2+} and PO_{4}^{3−} ions – in other words, the concentration of these ions is far in excess of the limit beyond which hydroxyapatite crystals would normally begin to precipitate from the solution (a pathological condition known as metastatic calcification).

==== Regulation ====
The levels of PP_{i} are regulated by at least three molecules - notably tissue-nonspecific alkaline phosphatase (TNAP) which is secreted by osteoblasts locally into the osteoid to degrade PP_{i} and thus allow bone mineralization to proceed during bone growth or remodeling. Congenital deficiency of TNAP in animal models results in offspring with soft, inadequately calcified bones.

Osteoblasts also secrete nucleotide pyrophosphatase phosphodiesterase 1 (NPP1) which causes extracellular PP_{i} production, and progressive ankylosis protein homolog (ANK) which promotes PP_{i} transport out of cells. Deficiencies of NPP1 and ANK result in deficient extracellular PP_{i} concentrations and are clinically associated with metastatic calcification and excessive calcification of bone (manifesting clinically e.g. as osteophytes).

=== Research ===
Cells may channel intracellular PP_{i} into ECF. ANK is a non-enzymatic plasma-membrane PP_{i} channel that supports extracellular PP_{i} levels. Defective function of the membrane PP_{i} channel ANK is associated with low extracellular PP_{i} and elevated intracellular PP_{i}. Ectonucleotide pyrophosphatase/phosphodiesterase (ENPP) may function to raise extracellular PP_{i}.

== As a food additive ==
Various diphosphates are used as emulsifiers, stabilisers, acidity regulators, raising agents, sequestrants, and water retention agents in food processing. They are classified in the E number scheme under E450:

- E450(a): disodium dihydrogen diphosphate; trisodium diphosphate; tetrasodium diphosphate (TSPP); tetrapotassium diphosphate
- E450(b): pentasodium and pentapotassium triphosphate
- E450(c): sodium and potassium polyphosphates

In particular, various formulations of diphosphates are used to stabilize whipped cream.

== See also ==
- Adenosine monophosphate
- Adenosine diphosphate
- Adenosine triphosphate
- ATPase
- ATP hydrolysis
- ATP synthase
- Biochemistry
- Bone
- Calcium pyrophosphate
- Calcium pyrophosphate dihydrate deposition disease
- Catalysis
- DNA
- High energy phosphate
- Inorganic pyrophosphatase
- Nucleoside triphosphate
- Nucleotide
- Organophosphate
- Oxidative phosphorylation
- Phosphate
- Phosphoric acid
- Phosphoric acids and phosphates
- RNA
- Sodium pyrophosphate
- Superphosphate
- Thiamine pyrophosphate
- Tooth
- Zinc pyrophosphate
