= Echogenic intracardiac focus =

Bright spot seen on ultrasound imaging

Echogenic intracardiac focus (EIF) is a small bright spot seen in the baby's heart on an ultrasound exam. This is thought to represent mineralization, or small deposits of calcium, in the muscle of the heart. EIFs are found in about 3–5% of normal pregnancies and cause no health problems.

EIFs themselves have no impact on health or heart function. Often the EIF is gone by the third trimester. If there are no problems or chromosome abnormalities, EIFs are considered normal changes, or variants.

== Association with birth defects ==
Researchers have noted an association between an EIF and a chromosome problem in the baby. Types of chromosome problems that are occasionally seen include trisomy 13 (Patau syndrome) or trisomy 21 (Down syndrome). In the case of an isolated EIF, and no other ultrasound findings, some studies show that the risk for a chromosome abnormality is approximately two times a woman's background risk. Other studies report up to a 1% risk for Down syndrome when an EIF is seen on a second trimester fetal ultrasound exam.

== A clue to chromosome problems ==
An EIF is one clue which can contribute to the chances of a chromosome problem existing. Generally the risks are low if there are no other risk factors. Many babies with chromosome problems do not show any signs on ultrasound. Other factors are discussed in counseling include:

- Mother's age at the expected date of delivery
- The results of the Expanded AFP blood triple test
- Evidence of other "fetal findings" seen on the ultrasound that suggest a chromosome problem.

== Options ==
The best available evidence suggests that an isolated echogenic intracardiac focus in the fetus of an otherwise low risk woman does not confer an increased risk of fetal aneuploidy. Although some studies have reported that the number or location of echogenic foci affects the risk of fetal aneuploidy (higher risk with biventricular or right ventricular involvement), the general consensus is that these factors have not been proven to matter. When an echogenic intracardiac focus is identified in an otherwise normal second trimester fetus, a normal cell-free DNA test can be very reassuring and obviate the need for invasive testing.

Amniocentesis is a test to check a baby's chromosomes. A small amount of amniotic fluid, which contains some fetal cells, is removed and tested. Amniocentesis is very accurate; however, there is a risk of miscarriage which occur in 0.5–1% of women who have amniocentesis. Results take about two weeks. A normal amniocentesis result means the EIF is not significant and there would be no other concerns about it. That is usually done between 15 and 20 weeks of pregnancy (during the second trimester).

== Summary ==
An EIF in the fetal heart may indicate an increased chance of the baby having a chromosome problem. It does not affect the development of the baby or the function of the heart. If the baby has normal chromosomes, there would be no associated problems to be concerned about. No special treatment or tests are needed at delivery.

It is important to remember that with an isolated EIF, chances are strongly in favor of a normal pregnancy outcome, but the patient is entitled to further counseling and testing options.
