= Paraumbilical hernia =

Protrusion of tissue through a hole in the abdominal wall near the navel

- Specialty: General surgery

A paraumbilical hernia (sometimes termed acquired umbilical hernia of adults) is a protrusion of tissue through a defect of the abdominal wall which is located adjacent to the umbilicus (navel). The hernial sac is lined by peritoneum. It may contain omental fat, or loops of large and small intestine

Umbilical hernias usually occur in newborn babies. True umbilical hernias are rare in adults, but paraumbilical hernias do occur in adults.

== Classification ==
Paraumbilical hernias are classed as ventral hernias or abdominal wall hernias. Those occurring above the level of the umbilicus are sometimes termed epigastric hernias or supraumbilical. Those below the umbilicus are hypogastric hernias or infraumbilical. Epigastric hernias may contain fat, blood vessels, and abdominal organs (intestine). However, epigastric hernias may be located anywhere along the midline from above the umbilicus to below the xiphoid process, and they are therefore not often considered a type of paraumbilical hernia.

== Signs and symptoms ==
The hernia appears as a swelling / lump next to the umbilicus. The normal shape and position of the umbilicus may be distorted into a crescent shape by pressure from the hernia.

Paraumbilical hernias may not cause any symptoms. They may even be undetected (occult). They tend to gradually increase in size without treatment. The neck of the hernial sac may only be narrow compared to its size, and it may hang down.

Pain, if present, is usually caused by prolonged standing or vigorous exercise. A large paraumbilical hernia may cause a "dragging pain" because of its weight. Small paraumbilical hernias may be painless but sometimes may cause some discomfort.

Gastrointestinal symptoms (e.g., pain, vomiting) may occur, and are the result of traction on the small intestines, stomach, transverse colon and omentum. Partial intestinal obstruction may cause symptoms of intestinal colic.

On percussion, the lump sounds "dull" if it contains omentum, but it may sound resonant if it contains a segment of intestine. The hernial sac may contain large intestine or small intestine.

== Causes ==
Paraumbilical hernias are caused by a defect in the linea alba next to the umbilicus. The linea alba is a fibrous connection in the midline between the left and right rectus abdominis muscles. The defect may be called diastasis recti which is an increased gap between the right and left rectus abdominis muscles. The weakest area of the umbilical scar is the superior aspect between the umbilical vein and the umbilical ring.

Due to various factors, a sac of peritoneum (hernial sac) is pushed through the defect / weak area in the midline of the abdominal wall. The hernial sac contains omentum (fat tissue). In larger hernias, the sac may contain loops of small or large intestine. The peritoneum is fixed at the umbilicus. Therefore, as the hernia increases in size, the hernial sac splits open.

Adhesions may develop if the paraumbilical hernia is present for a long time. An adhesion is a band of fibrotic tissue that occurs between two previously unconnected structures in response to injury. Adhesions are common between the contents of the hernia and the fundus. Over time, the hernia sac may become loculated because of formation of several adhesions. For this reason paraumbilical hernias are not usually reducible (cannot be "pushed back in"). This is also termed incarceration. Strangulation of the hernia is possible. This is where the blood supply to the tissues contained inside the hernia is compromised. This situation may be a surgical emergency.

One risk factor for paraumbilical hernia is obesity. Indeed, most people who get paraumbilical hernias are obese females.

Alteration in the ultrastructure of collagen may cause abdominal wall hernias such as paraumbilical hernia.

== Diagnosis ==
The differential diagnosis includes umbilical hernia, omphalocele, cyst of the vitello intestinal duct (omphalomesenteric duct cyst), cyst of the urachus, and metastatic tumor (a lump caused by spread of cancer from another part of the body). An ultrasound scan may be used to help with diagnosis.

== Treatment ==
Surgery is generally indicated because paraumbilical hernias may increase in size and associated symptoms may also increase. There is also a risk of strangulation if the hernia is not repaired surgically. The main procedures are:

- Primary suture repair, which may be used for small defects This has a high rate of recurrence.
- Mayo's repair. This is possible for paraumbilical hernias smaller than 4 cm diameter. It has a high rate of recurrence.
- Mesh hernioplasty uses surgical mesh to repair the hernia. It may be indicated for paraumbilical hernias larger than 4 cm and for recurrent paraumbilical hernias. Mesh hernioplasty may be performed as open surgery or with the laparoscopic approach.
- Lipectomy or abdominoplasty may be considered at the same time as repair of the hernia for obese people with paraumbilical hernia.

Possible complications of surgery include bleeding, wound dehiscence (splitting open of the surgical incision after the operation), wound infection, hematoma, and seroma. There is a risk that the hernia can happen again after the surgery (recurrence). The risk of dehiscence, infection, and recurrence is higher with open repair compared to laparoscopic surgery. People also recover more quickly, have less pain and spend less days in hospital after laparoscopic surgery. However, the laparoscopic procedure takes more time because it involves extra steps.

The rate of recurrence may be lower with laparoscopic approach because the hernia repair is done without tension, with generous overlap of mesh, and other defects around the original hernia can be identified and repaired at the same time. Laparoscopic has some disadvantages however. There is a risk of injury to the intestine or bladder. Enterotomy is accidental incision into the intestine. This may occur during trocar (port) placement or when adhesions are being divided. In this event, the laparoscopic approach may need to be abandoned and converted into an open surgery. There is also a small risk of port site hernia. This is the later occurrence of a new hernia at the site where the port was inserted, because a weakness is created in the abdominal wall.

Obesity (body mass index >30) increases the risk of wound complications after paraumbilical hernia repair by four times, and there is higher risk of re-admission to hospital.

== Prognosis ==
Without treatment, the main risk is incarceration and strangulation.

== Epidemiology ==
Paraumbilical and umbilical hernias together make up 10-12% of all abdominal wall hernias. True umbilical hernia is rare in adults. Hernias close to the umbilicus in adults are usually paraumbilical hernias.

Most people who get paraumbilical hernias are female. There is a male to female ratio of about 1:5. The most common age is 35-50.
