= N4-(beta-N-acetylglucosaminyl)-L-asparaginase =

Class of enzymes

Identifiers
- EC no.: 3.5.1.26
- CAS no.: 9075-24-5

Databases
- BRENDA: enzyme data
- ExPASy: NiceZyme view
- KEGG: enzyme entry
- MetaCyc: metabolic pathway
- Rhea: reactions
- PDB structures: RCSB PDB PDBe PDBsum
Search
- PMC: articles
- PubMed: articles
- NCBI: proteins

N4-(beta-N-acetylglucosaminyl)-L-asparaginase (EC 3.5.1.26, aspartylglucosylamine deaspartylase, aspartylglucosylaminase, aspartylglucosaminidase, aspartylglycosylamine amidohydrolase, N-aspartyl-beta-glucosaminidase, glucosylamidase, beta-aspartylglucosylamine amidohydrolase, 4-N-(beta-N-acetyl-D-glucosaminyl)-L-asparagine amidohydrolase) is an enzyme with systematic name N4-(beta-N-acetyl-D-glucosaminyl)-L-asparagine amidohydrolase. It catalyses the following chemical reaction

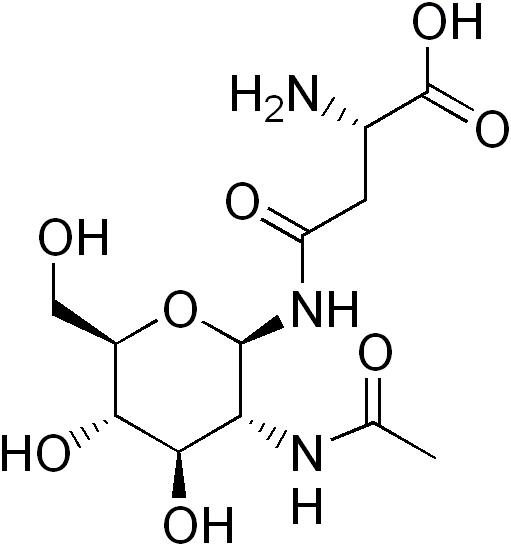
aspartylglucosamine
H_{2}O
N-acetyl-β-D-glucosaminylamine
+
aspartic acid

The enzyme characterised from mammalian kidney and hen oviduct hydrolyses aspartylglucosamine to N-acetyl-β-D-glucosaminylamine and aspartic acid. It acts only on asparagine-oligosaccharides containing one amino acid, the final step in glycoprotein degradation.

== See also ==
- Aspartylglucosaminidase, the human variant of β-aspartyl-N-acetylglucosaminidase
- β-aspartyl-N-acetylglucosaminidase, which hydrolyses aspartylglucosamine to N-acetyl-D-glucosamine and L-asparagine
