= Ectopia cordis =

Birth defect in which the heart is positioned outside the thorax

- Other names: Ectopic heart
- Specialty: Cardiology; Cardiothoracic surgery Medical genetics

Ectopia cordis (from Greek 'away, out of place' and Latin 'heart') or ectopic heart is a congenital malformation in which the heart is abnormally located either partially or totally outside of the thorax. The ectopic heart can be found along a spectrum of anatomical locations. In most cases, the heart protrudes outside the chest through a split sternum. The condition has a low survival rate, though surgery has been an effective treatment in some cases.

== Pathology ==
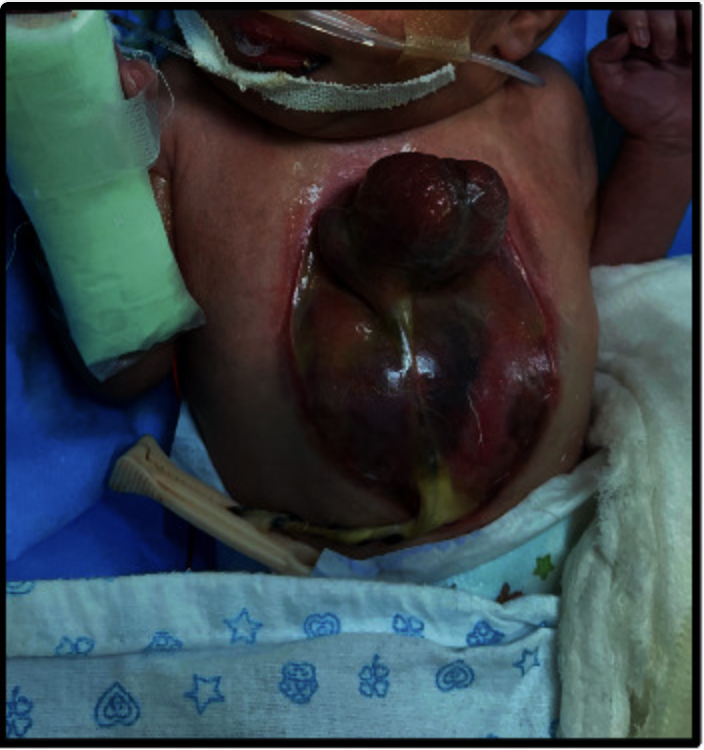
Infant with ectopia cordis and an abdominal wall defect suggestive of omphalocele

Ectopia cordis (EC) results from a failure of proper maturation of midline mesoderm and ventral body wall (chest) formation during embryonic development. It usually happens when the embryo is developing, at around 3-4 weeks gestation. The exact etiology remains unknown, but there are different theories. One theory is that the heart doesn't move down from the neck region correctly and the ventral wall doesn't fuse how it is supposed to. Another theory is that fibrous bands form due to the rupture of the chorion. These bands compress the midline and keep it from fusing. The final theory is that fetuses with EC do not have the BMP2 gene which is responsible for a functional bone morphogenetic protein that closes the ventral body wall and forms some heart structures.

Defective ventral body wall formation can yield a heart unprotected by the pericardium, sternum, or skin to different degrees. In addition, the heart can be in different locations, meaning there are different types of EC. The five types are cervical, which makes up 5% of cases, cervicothoracic and thoracic making up 65%, thoracoabdominal at around 20%, and lastly abdominal making up 10% of cases.

Many cases of ectopia cordis have associated congenital heart defects, in which the heart has failed to properly form. Other organs may also have formed outside the skin, as well. EC is commonly associated with Pentalogy of Cantrell (POC). POC is when five different congenital defects occur simultaneously, either completely or partially. These include the heart (ectopia cordis), pericardium, diaphragm, sternum, and abdominal wall.

Defects more commonly associated with ectopia cordis include:

- Intracardiac defects
  - Atrial septal defect
  - Ventricular septal defect
  - Tetralogy of Fallot
  - Tricuspid atresia
  - Double outlet right ventricle
- Non-cardiac malformations
  - Pentalogy of Cantrell
  - Omphalocele
  - Anterior diaphragmatic hernia
  - Cleft palate

== Diagnosis ==
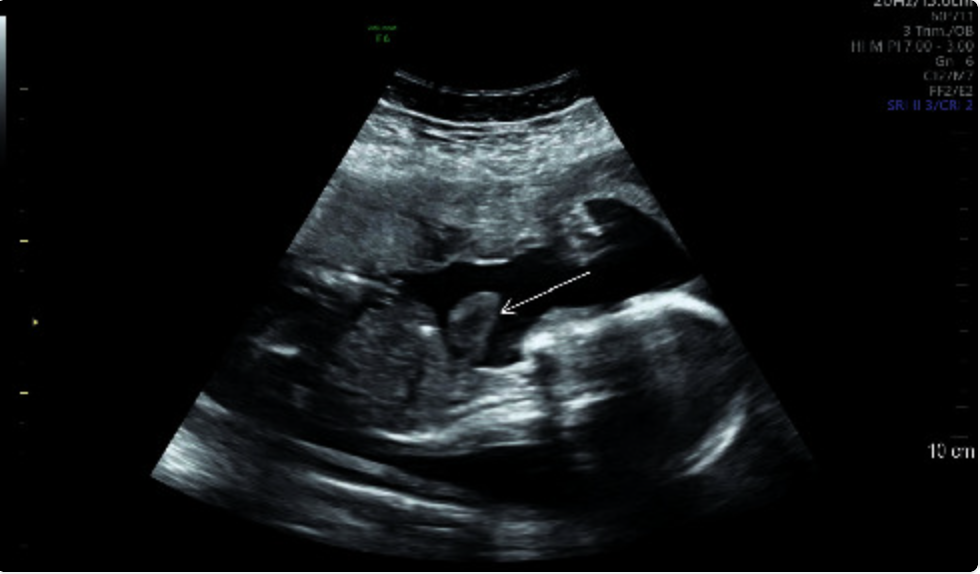
Ultrasound diagnosing ectopia cordis where the heart is outside the thorax (arrow)

Ectopia cordis is extremely rare, occurring in about 5.5 to 7.9 births per million. In all congenital heart diseases, EC makes up 0.1%. It is most commonly diagnosed during a routine prenatal ultrasound. A diagnosis can be made as early as ten weeks. In some cases, EC cannot be diagnosed in an ultrasound; instead, the heart is observed outside of the thoracic cavity post-natally. Prognosis is improved with earlier diagnosis, as most cases diagnosed after birth result in death.

== Treatment ==
Due to the rarity and rapid postpartum mortality of ectopia cordis, limited treatment options have been developed. The primary treatment is a corrective surgery, which has its own challenges. The original procedure was to put the heart and vessels all back into the chest cavity in one surgery, but after discovering that this may cause a low output, a new procedure was proposed. The new procedure takes place in stages. The first surgery is to place the heart partially into the thoracic cavity, and covering it with synthetic material. Then, in the second, the muscle, bone, and cartilage is reconstructed to accommodate the heart. However, the treatment is not always effective, and the mortality rate is high despite recent surgical progression.

== Prognosis ==
Children diagnosed with ectopia cordis have a survival rate of around 10%, and typically don't survive past the first few days of life. In recent years, some progress has been made in effective treatment, but there are still a lot of unknowns. The prognosis of ectopia cordis is influenced by various factors:

1. Rate of pregnancy termination after diagnosis
  - Increased rate causes overestimation of mortality
2. Maturity of body systems and infant weight
3. Location of the defect
  - Cervical
  - Thoracic
  - Thoracoabdominal
  - Abdominal
4. Extent of the cardiac displacement
5. Presence or absence of intracardiac defects
6. Presence or absence of non-cardiac defects
7. Surgical timing

In general, the prognosis for ectopia cordis is poor—most cases result in death shortly after birth due to infection, hypoxemia, or cardiac failure. Some evidence suggests that well timed surgery increases the rate of survival, as does more mature body systems and birth weight, and decreased presence of defects.

== Epidemiology ==
The occurrence of ectopia cordis is less than 8 per million births. This malformation is random, not hereditary. Also, its cause is currently unknown. Separately, it is associated with chromosomal disorders like turner syndrome and trisomy 21. EC is also associated with amniotic band syndrome, a condition where bands are attached to the heart. This condition is also not hereditary.

It is typically classified according to location of the ectopic heart. This includes cervical, thoracic, thoracoabdominal, and abdominal. It tends to be more common in males than females, and there have been no documented cases where more than one sibling in a family had the condition.

== Ectopia cordis interna hoax ==
In 2015, the radiology website Radiopaedia published an April Fools' hoax featuring an X-ray image digitally altered to show the heart positioned in the abdomen beneath the diaphragm. The case was presented under the title Ectopia cordis interna - Tin Man syndrome. In the years that followed, numerous radiology and medical professionals shared the image on social media, unaware that it was a fabrication.

In 2025, a team of Iraqi researchers published a paper in the academic journal, Medicine, describing an asymptomatic case of Ectopia cordis interna. A private inquiry later indicated that the report had been based on the 2015 hoax. When questioned, the authors were unable to provide the necessary documentation of the condition. The journal eventually retracted the article.
