= Abdominal wall defect =

Birth defect in which the abdominal wall fails to close

- Specialty: Medical genetics

Abdominal wall defects are a type of congenital defect that allows the stomach, intestines, or other organs to protrude through an unusual opening that forms on the abdomen.

During the development of the fetus, many unexpected changes occur inside the womb. Specifically, the stomach, intestines, or other organs begin to develop outside the fetus' abdomen through the abnormal hole in the abdomen and, as development progresses, the abdominal wall eventually encloses these organs. In some cases of defect either the umbilical opening is too oversized or has developed improperly which allows the organs to remain outside or to squeeze through the abdominal wall.

There are two main types of abdominal wall defects that result due to the changes during development. They are omphalocele and gastroschisis. Gastroschisis develops when the abdominal wall does not completely close, and the organs are present outside of the infant's body. Omphalocele occurs when some of the organs protrude through the muscles of the abdomen in the area surrounding the umbilical cord. Omphalocele can be either minor, with only some of the organs exposed, or severe, with most, if not all of the abdominal organs being exposed.

== Presentation ==
=== Complications ===
Concerns that arise due to abdominal wall defects can be threatening and require immediate and intensive medical care. Some infections may persist for long periods of time and lead to serious complications, such as feeding problems, which can cause the infant to require several surgeries. Since these complications can be severe, it is recommended that parents work closely with a team of physicians throughout the duration of the treatment. After the treatment is completed, children with abdominal wall defects may need additional help. Additional services are usually necessary for with omphalocele and the associated chromosomal abnormalities and birth defects that also arise. Treatments in these cases are long-term and focus on the physical and developmental difficulties that the children will endure. The parents may find this process difficult and need assistance in dealing with the process by a service that is provided by the healthcare team.

== Cause ==
Out of all of the causes of birth defects information about a great number is still unknown. As of 2004, the reason that abdominal wall defects occur has yet to be determined or understood. The symptoms that the mother may present that would indicate the development of the defect and unnoticeable. Most cases of abdominal wall defects have been found to be sporadic and have no relationship with the history of the disorder within the family.

The EPA is aware that a common herbicide called Atrazine causes abdominal wall defects as well as other birth defects and cancer. Atrazine has been banned in the EU since 2004, yet is still commonly used in the US despite the evidence of harm. Atrazine affects the drinking water supply, most predominantly in the midwest.{{citation needed|date=October 2020}}

The Center for Disease Control and Prevention did a study on the relationship between Atrazine and abdominal wall defects:

"Gastroschisis and omphalocele are congenital abdominal wall defects (AWD). Atrazine and nitrates are common agricultural fertilizers"

and concluded:

"Indiana has significantly higher rates of AWD [abdominal wall defects] compared with national rates. Increased atrazine levels correlate with increased incidence of AWD."

== Diagnosis ==
Before birth, openings in the abdomen can usually be detected by a detailed ultrasound or AFP screening. In addition to the ultrasound or AFP scanning, it is also necessary for children with this defect to be checked for other birth defects because genetic disorders are usually associated with some of the abdominal wall defects. In looking for other genetic disorders that may be associated, Genetic counseling and further genetic testing, such as amniocentesis, are offered.

== Treatment ==
Abdominal wall defects can be treated surgically if there are no accompanying anomalies. The surgical procedure also called omphalocele repair/closure or gastroschisis repair/closure is not overcomplicated. The organs are normal but are misplaced.

However, if the abdominal cavity is too small or when the organs are too large or swollen to close the skin, it may be difficult to fit all the viscera into the small abdominal cavity. In such cases, the surgeon will place a covering pouch generally made of silastic, commonly called a silo (because it's shaped like an agricultural silo), over the abdominal organs on the outside of the infant. The silo serves to conserve heat and prevent infection. The silo is spring-loaded so that the device can be attached to the inside of the abdominal wall without sutures. The top of the silo is secured in a way that causes it to stand upright, so that the bowels are gradually coaxed into the abdominal cavity by gravity. This process can take up to a week, and final closure may be performed a few weeks later. More surgery may be required to repair the abdominal muscles at a later time.

== Prognosis ==
If there are no other defects, the prognosis after surgical repair of this condition is relatively good. However, 10% of those with more severe or additional abnormalities die from it. The organs themselves are fully functional; the difficulty lies in fitting them inside the abdomen. The condition is, in fact, a hernia requiring only replacement and strengthening of the passageway through which it occurred. After surgery, increased pressure in the stretched abdomen can compromise the function of the organs inside.

== Incidence ==
Abdominal wall defects, specifically the main two types, gastroschisis and omphalocele, are rare, occurring in about one out of every 5000 births. There is no difference in prevalence between boys and girls. Birthing individuals who are below the age of twenty are almost four times as likely to have an offspring that has developed an abdominal wall defect compared to those in their late twenties and older.

== See also ==
- Abdominal wall
