= Pentalogy of Cantrell =

Birth defects of the diaphragm, abdominal wall, pericardium, heart and lower sternum

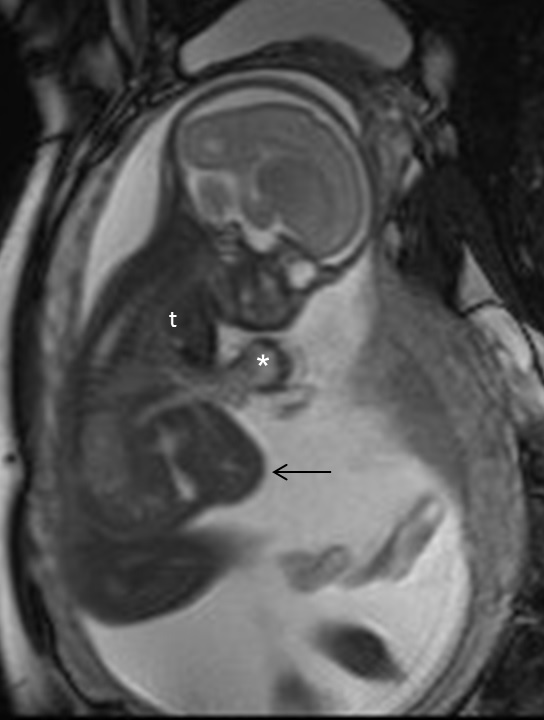
- MRI in pregnancy in a case of pentalogy of Cantrell, showing ectopia cordis (*), partial herniation of the liver (arrow), and a small thoracic cavity (t)
- Specialty: Medical genetics

Pentalogy of Cantrell (or thoraco-abdominal syndrome) is an extremely rare congenital syndrome that causes defects involving the diaphragm, abdominal wall, pericardium, heart and lower sternum.

== Presentation ==
There are five characteristic findings in pentalogy of Cantrell:

1. an abdominal wall defect,
2. lower sternal defect,
3. congenital heart malformations,
4. absence of the diaphragmatic pericardium,
5. and an anterior diaphragmatic defect.

Abdominal wall defects in pentalogy of Cantrell occur above the umbilicus (supraumbilical) and in the midline, and have a wide range of presentations. Diastasis recti, hernias, and omphalocele have all been described in conjunction with the pentalogy.

Sternal defects too have a range of presentations, from absence of the xiphoid process to shortened or cleft sternum. If the sternal defect is large enough, the neonate may have ectopia cordis, in which the heart is located outside of the thorax.

Many congenital heart malformations have been described in conjunction with pentalogy of Cantrell. The most common is ventricular septal defect, found in 72% of cases. Others include atrial septal defect, cardiac diverticulum, pulmonic stenosis, double outlet right ventricle, tetralogy of Fallot, dextrocardia, and transposition of the great vessels.

== Causes ==
Most cases of pentalogy of Cantrell are idiopathic (no known cause). However, some cases have been described with a genetic linkage to a locus at Xq25-q26.1.

== Epidemiology ==
Pentalogy of Cantrell occurs in 1/65,000 to 1/200,000 live births.

== History ==
It was first characterized in 1958.

A 2010 study concluded that the 13th-century Christian saint Rose of Viterbo died of complications of Pentalogy of Cantrell.
