= Omphalocele =

Abdominal wall birth defect

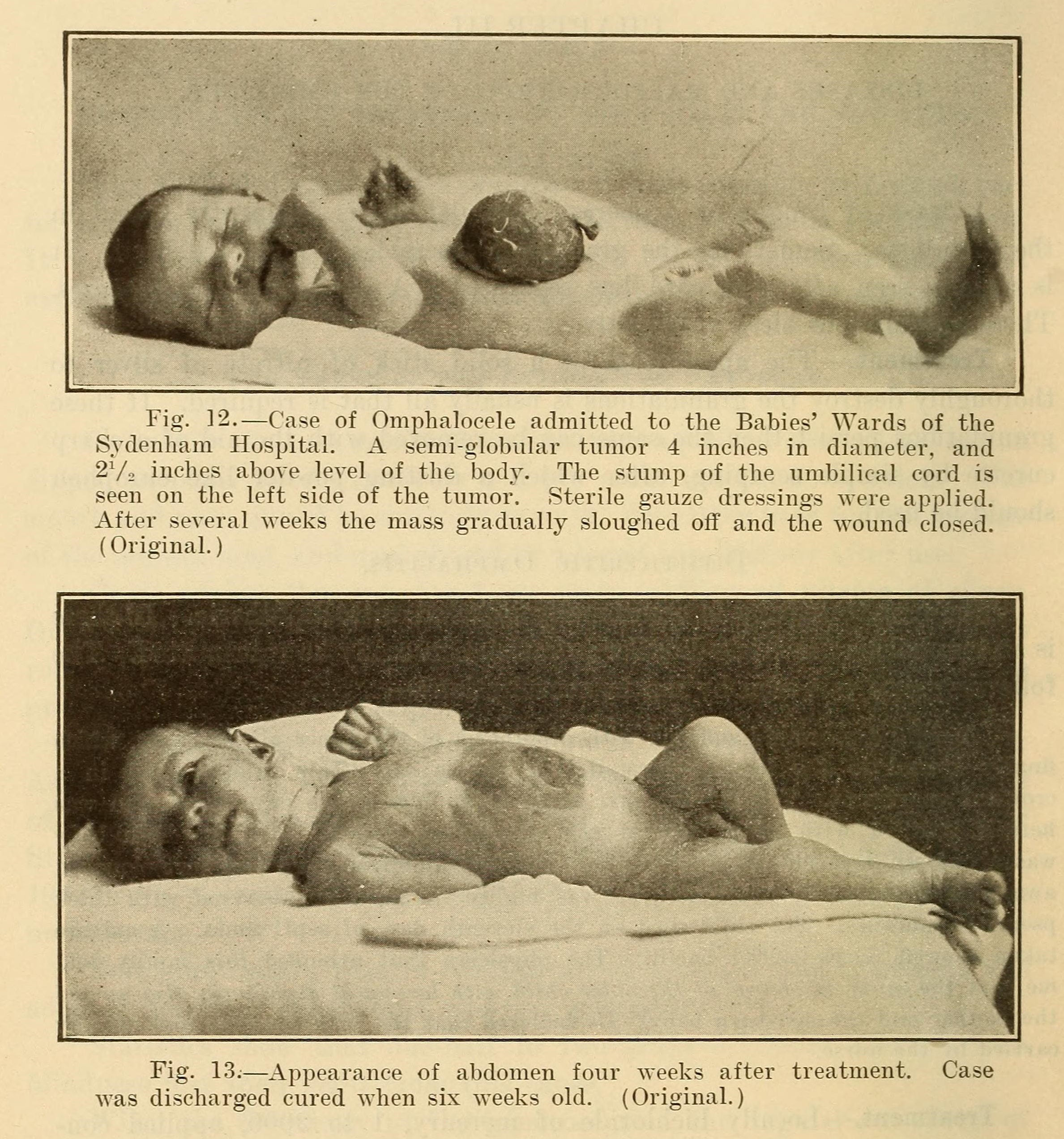
- Infant before and after surgical treatment for exomphalos.
- Specialty: Medical genetics
- Symptoms: Visible organs
- Usual onset: Congenital
- Treatment: Surgical repair
- Prognosis: varies- see below

An omphalocele or omphalocoele, also known as an exomphalos, is a rare abdominal wall defect. Beginning at the 6th week of development, rapid elongation of the gut and increased liver size reduces intra-abdominal space, which pushes intestinal loops out of the abdominal cavity. Around the 10th week, the intestine returns to the abdominal cavity and the process is completed by the 12th week. Persistence of intestine or the presence of other abdominal viscera (e.g. stomach, liver) in the umbilical cord results in an omphalocele.

Omphalocele occurs in 1 in 4,000 births and is associated with a high rate of mortality (25%) and severe malformations, such as cardiac anomalies (50%), neural tube defect (40%), exstrophy of the bladder and Beckwith–Wiedemann syndrome. Approximately 15% of live-born infants with omphalocele have chromosomal abnormalities. About 30% of infants with an omphalocele have other congenital abnormalities.

== Signs and symptoms ==
The sac, which is formed from an outpouching of the peritoneum, protrudes in the midline, through the umbilicus (navel).

It is normal for the intestines to protrude from the abdomen, into the umbilical cord, until about the tenth week of pregnancy, after which they return to inside the fetal abdomen. The omphalocele can be mild, with only a small loop of intestines present outside the abdomen, or severe, containing most of the abdominal organs. In severe cases surgical treatment is made more difficult because the infant's abdomen is abnormally small, having had no need to expand to accommodate the developing organs.

Larger omphaloceles are associated with a higher risk of cardiac defects.

=== Complications ===
Complications may occur prenatally, during birth, management, treatment or after surgery. Both prenatally and during birth, the exomphalos can rupture. During birth there may be trauma to the liver for giant omphaloceles. During management exomphalos can act as a metabolic drain affecting nitrogen balance which can lead to failure to thrive, as well as hypothermia. Use of a non-absorbent patch during surgery can lead to wound sepsis post-surgery. Herniation from the patch is also a possibility. Intestinal dysfunction for a few weeks after the surgery is common, therefore parenteral feeding is continued post-surgery, however prolonged use of this may lead to hepatomegaly and cholestasis. If intestinal dysfunction persists it can lead to intestinal necrosis. Intestinal atresia can occur, which is where the mucosa and submucosa of the intestine form a web that obstructs the lumen which leads to malabsorption. Obstruction of the bowel can occur which results in short bowel syndrome. For the first few years of life there is a high incidence of gastroesophageal reflux which can be complicated by oesophagitis.

Post-surgery the umbilicus (navel) is deficient or abnormally placed that causes dislike amongst many patients. Umbilical reconstruction can be difficult due to scar tissue and lack of extra skin for surgical use, though this can be overcome by using tissue expanders below the skin and umbilicoplasty.

Ultimately, prognosis depends on the size of the defect and whether associated abnormalities are present or complications develop. Mortalities and morbidities still occur, with the mortality rate for large omphaloceles with associated abnormalities being higher. Most surviving omphalocele infants have no-long-term problems and grow up to be normal individuals.

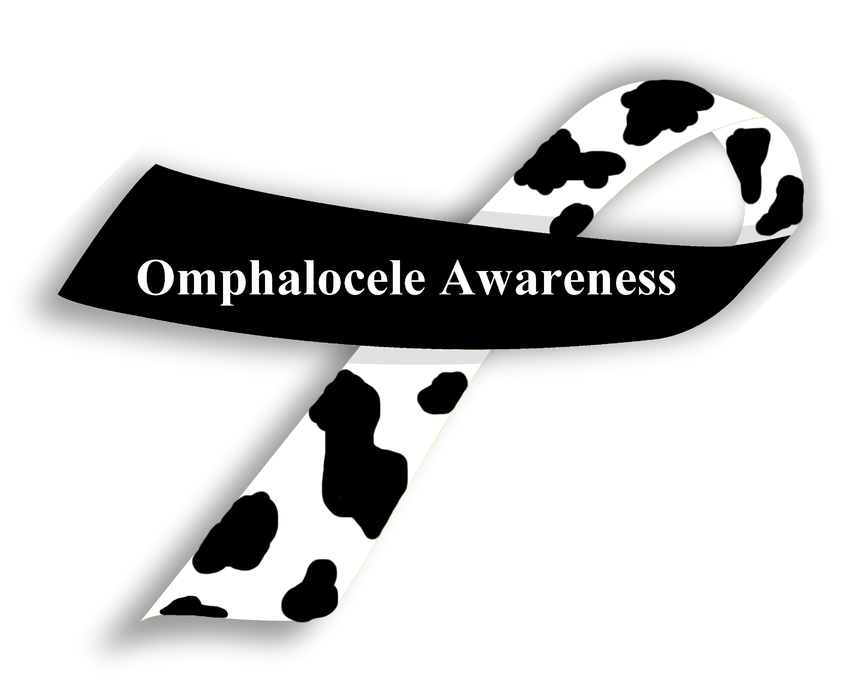
Omphalocele awareness ribbon

== Causes ==
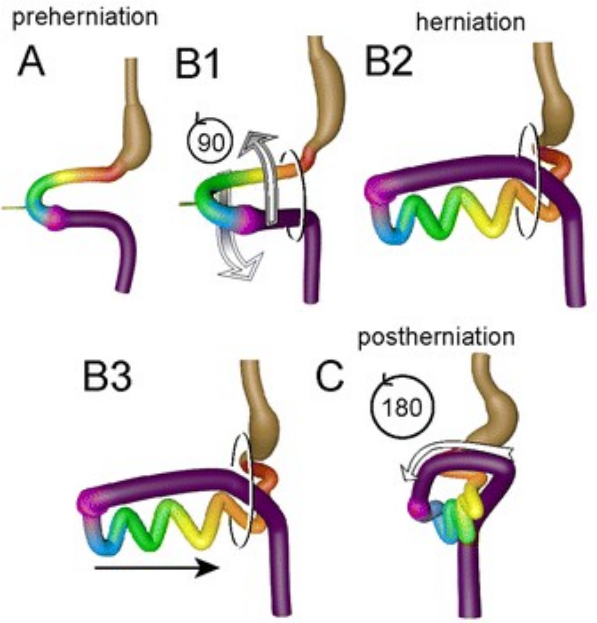
Diagram showing the process by which the intestine rotates and herniates during normal development. From panel A to B (left-sided views), the midgut loop rotates 90° in a counterclockwise direction, so that its position changes from midsagittal (A) to transverse (B1). The small intestine forms loops (B2) and slides back into the abdomen (B3) during resolution of the hernia. Meanwhile, the cecum moves from the left to the right side, which represents the additional 180° counterclockwise rotation of the intestine (C, central view).

Omphalocele is caused by malrotation of the bowels while returning to the abdomen during development. Some cases of omphalocele are believed to be due to an underlying genetic disorder, such as Edward's syndrome (trisomy 18) or Patau syndrome (trisomy 13).

Beckwith–Wiedemann syndrome is also associated with omphaloceles.

=== Pathophysiology ===
Exomphalos is caused by a failure of the ventral body wall to form and close the naturally occurring umbilical hernia that occurs during embryonic folding which is a process of embryogenesis. The normal process of embryogenesis is that at 2 weeks gestation the human embryo is a flat disc that consists of three layers, the outer ectoderm and inner endoderm separated by a middle layer called the mesoderm. The ectoderm gives rise to skin and the CNS, the mesoderm gives rise to muscle and the endoderm gives rise to organs. The focus areas for exomphalos are that the ectoderm will form the umbilical ring, the mesoderm will form the abdominal muscles and the endoderm will form the gut. After the disc becomes tri-layered, it undergoes growth and folding to transform it from disc to cylinder shaped. The layer of ectoderm and mesoderm in the dorsal axis grow ventrally to meet at the midline. Simultaneously, the cephalic (head) and caudal (tail) ends of these layers of the disc fold ventrally to meet the lateral folds in the center. The meeting of both axis at the center form the umbilical ring. Meanwhile, the endoderm migrates to the center of this cylinder.

By the fourth week of gestation the umbilical ring is formed. During the 6th week the midgut rapidly grows from the endoderm which causes a herniation of the gut through the umbilical ring. The gut rotates as it re-enters the abdominal cavity which allows for the small intestine and colon to migrate to their correct anatomical position by the end of the 10th week of development. This process fails to occur normally in cases of exomphalos, resulting in abdominal contents protruding from the umbilical ring.

Gut contents fail to return to the abdomen due to a fault in myogenesis (muscle formation and migration during embryogenesis). During embryogenesis the mesoderm that forms muscle divides into several somites that migrate dorso-ventrally towards the midline. The somites develop three parts that are sclerotome which will form bone, dermatome which will form skin of the back and myotome which will form muscle. The somites that remain close to the neural tube at the back of the body have epaxial myotome, whilst the somites that migrate to the midline have hypaxial myotome. The hypaxial myotome forms the abdominal muscles. The myotome cells will give rise to myoblasts (embryonic progenitor cells) which will align to form myotubules and then muscle fibers. Consequently, the myotome will become three muscle sheets that form the layers of abdominal wall muscles. The muscle of concern for exomphalos is the rectus abdominis. In the disease the muscle undergoes normal differentiation but fails to expand ventro-medially and narrow the umbilical ring which causes the natural umbilical hernia that occurs at 6 weeks of gestation to remain external to the body.

The location of the folding defect in the embryo determines the ultimate position of the exomphalos. A cephalic folding defect results in an epigastric exomphalos that is positioned high up on the abdomen which can be seen in the chromosomal defect pentalogy of Cantrell. Lateral folding defects result in a typical exomphalos that is positioned in the middle of the abdomen. A caudal folding defect results in a hypogastric exomphalos that is positioned on the lower abdomen.

=== Genetics ===
The genes that cause exomphalos are controversial and subject to research. Exomphalos is greatly associated with chromosomal defects and thus these are being explored to pinpoint the genetic cause of the disease. Studies in mice have indicated that mutations in the fibroblast growth factor receptors 1 and 2 (Fgfr1, Fgfr2) cause exomphalos. Fibroblast growth factor (FBGF) encourages the migration of myotubules during myogenesis. When FBGF runs out myoblasts stop migrating, cease division and differentiate into myotubules that form muscle fibers. Mutations in homeobox genes such as Alx4, that direct the formation of body structures during early embryonic development cause exomphalos in mice. Mutations in the Insulin like growth factor-2 gene (IGF2) and its associated receptor gene IGF2R cause high levels of IGF-2 protein in humans which leads to exomphalos in the associated disease Beckwith Wiedemann syndrome (BWS). IFG2R is responsible for degradation of excess IGF-2 protein. BWS disease is caused by a mutation in chromosome 11 at the locus where the IGF2 gene resides. Observance of the inheritance patterns of the associated anomalies through pedigrees show that exomphalos can be the result of autosomal dominant, autosomal recessive and X-linked inheritance.

=== Environmental factors ===
It is not well known if actions of the mother could predispose or cause the disease. Alcohol use during the first trimester, heavy smoking, use of certain medications like the selective serotonin-reuptake inhibitors and methimazole (anti-thyroid drug) during pregnancy, maternal febrile illness, IVF, parental consanguinity and obesity elevate the risk of a woman giving birth to a baby with exomphalos. Preventive methods that could be utilised by mothers include ingestion of a preconception multivitamin and supplementation with folic acid. Termination of pregnancy may be considered if a large exomphalos with associated congenital abnormalities is confirmed during prenatal diagnosis.

== Diagnosis ==
=== Related conditions ===
Gastroschisis is a similar birth defect, but in gastroschisis the umbilical cord is not involved and the intestinal protrusion is usually to the right of the midline. Parts of organs may be free in the amniotic fluid and not enclosed in a membranous (peritoneal) sac. Gastroschisis is less frequently associated with other defects than omphalocele.

Omphaloceles occurs more frequently with increased maternal age. Other related syndromes are Shprintzen Goldberg, pentalogy of Cantrell, Beckwith–Wiedemann and OEIS complex (omphalocele, exstrophy of the cloaca, imperforate anus, spinal defects).

After surgery a child with omphalocele will have some degree of intestinal malrotation. Due to intestinal malrotation 4.4% of children with omphalocele will experience a midgut volvulus in the days, months, or years after surgery. Parents of children with omphalocele should seek immediate medical attention if their child displays signs and symptoms of an intestinal obstruction at any point in their childhood to avoid the possibility of bowel necrosis or death.

Some experts differentiate exomphalos and omphalocele as 2 related conditions, one worse than the other; in this sense, exomphalos involves a stronger covering of the hernia (with fascia and skin), whereas omphalocele involves a weaker covering of only a thin membrane. Others consider the terms synonymous names for any degree of herniation and covering.

== Screening ==
An omphalocele is often detected through AFP screening or a detailed fetal ultrasound. Genetic counseling and genetic testing such as amniocentesis are usually offered during the pregnancy.

== Management ==
There is no treatment that is required prenatally unless there is a rupture of the exomphalos within the mother. An intact exomphalos can be delivered safely vaginally and C-sections are also acceptable if obstetrical reasons require it. There appears to be no advantage for delivery by C-section unless it is for a giant exomphalos that contains most of the liver. In this case vaginal delivery may result in dystocia (inability of the baby to exit the pelvis during birth) and liver damage. Immediately after birth a nasogastric tube is required to decompress the intestines and an endotracheal intubation is needed to support respiration. The exomphalos sac is kept warm and covered with a moist saline gauze and plastic transparent bowel bag to prevent fluid loss. The neonate also requires fluid, vitamin K and antibiotic administration intravenously. After management strategies are applied, a baby with an intact sac is medically stable and does not require urgent surgery. This time is used to assess the newborn to rule out associated anomalies prior to surgical closure of the defect. Studies show there is no significant difference in survival between immediate or delayed closure.

Surgery can be performed directly for small omphaloceles, which will require a short stay in the nursery department, or in a staged manner for large omphaloceles, which will require several weeks stay. Staged closure requires a temporary artificial holding sac (a silo) to be placed over the abdominal organs and sutured to the abdominal wall. This can be made of non-adhesive dressing. The silo is gradually reduced in size at least once daily until all of the viscera have been returned to the abdominal cavity. This is repeated for several days to a week until surgical closure of the fascia/skin can be done. Closure may require a patch that can be rigid or non-rigid and made of natural biomaterials such as a bovine pericardium or artificial materials. The skin is then closed over the patch and it is re-vascularised by the body's liver blood vessels post-surgery. The staged surgery is required, as rushed reduction of the exomphalos compromises venous return and ventilation, as it raises intra-abdominal pressure. In some cases, stretching of the abdominal wall to accommodate intestinal contents may be required. Non-operative therapy uses escharotic ointments. This is used for infants with large omphaloceles that have been born prematurely with respiratory insufficiency and associated chromosomal defects, as they would not be able to tolerate surgery. The ointment causes the sac to granulate and epithelialize, which leaves a residual large ventral hernia, which can be repaired later with surgery when the baby is more stable. After surgery, for larger omphaloceles, mechanical ventilation and parenteral nutrition is needed to manage the baby.

== Society and culture ==
=== Awareness Day ===
International Omphalocele Awareness Day is celebrated annually in the US on January 31, as part of Birth Defect Awareness Month. Several U.S. states have passed resolutions to officially recognize the date.
