= Omphalomesenteric duct cyst =

- Other names: Omphalomesenteric duct remnant, vitelline cyst
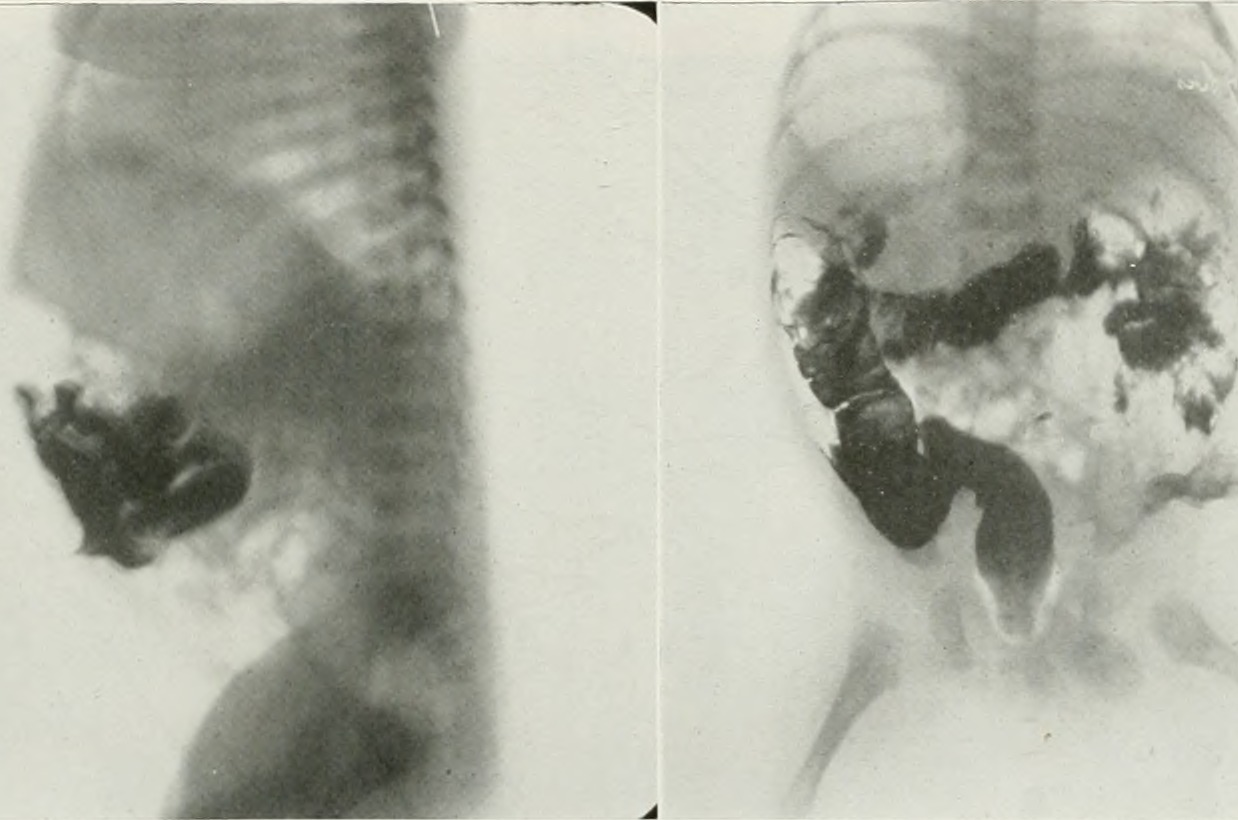
- Patent omphalomesenteric duct.
- Specialty: Dermatology, gastroenterology

Omphalomesenteric duct cysts (ODC), also known as an omphalomesenteric duct remnant or vitelline cyst, are developmental defects relating to the closure of the omphalomesenteric duct. It usually disintegrates within six weeks of gestation, but remnants of the cyst can sometimes be found along the intestines or umbilicus. Any remnants can be removed via surgical means.

== See also ==
- Pilomatricoma
- List of cutaneous conditions
