= Beta-aspartyl-N-acetylglucosaminidase =

Class of enzymes

Identifiers
- EC no.: 3.2.2.11
- CAS no.: 9027-31-0

Databases
- BRENDA: enzyme data
- ExPASy: NiceZyme view
- KEGG: enzyme entry
- MetaCyc: metabolic pathway
- Rhea: reactions
- PDB structures: RCSB PDB PDBe PDBsum
- Gene Ontology: AmiGO / QuickGO
Search
- PMC: articles
- PubMed: articles
- NCBI: proteins

Beta-aspartyl-N-acetylglucosaminidase (EC 3.2.2.11) is an enzyme that catalyzes the chemical reaction

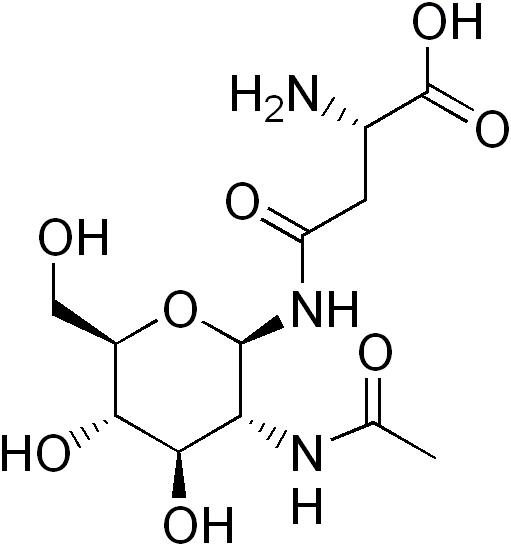
aspartylglucosamine
H_{2}O
N-acetyl-D-glucosamine
+
L-asparagine

The enzyme characterised from epididymis hydrolyses aspartylglucosamine to N-acetyl-D-glucosamine and L-asparagine. The enzyme also acts on other nitrogen-linked glycans.

This enzyme belongs to the family of hydrolases, specifically those glycosylases that hydrolyse N-glycosyl compounds. The systematic name of this enzyme class is 1-beta-aspartyl-N-acetyl-D-glucosaminylamine L-asparaginohydrolase. This enzyme is also called beta-aspartylacetylglucosaminidase.
