= Radiopaedia =

Collaborative wiki-based educational reference for the field of radiology

- Website type: Wiki
- Available in: English
- Owner: Radiopaedia Australia Pty Ltd
- Editor: Associate Professor Frank Gaillard
- Website: http://radiopaedia.org/
- Commercial: Yes
- Registration: Optional (required to edit)
- Launched: December 2005
- Current status: 16,719 articles with 56,720 cases (as of December 2023)

Radiopaedia is a wiki-based international collaborative educational web resource containing a radiology encyclopedia and imaging case repository. It is currently the largest freely available radiology related resource in the world with more than 60,000 patient cases and over 16,000 reference articles on radiology-related topics. The open edit nature of articles allows radiologists, radiology trainees, radiographers, sonographers, and other healthcare professionals interested in medical imaging to refine most content over time. An editorial board peer reviews all contributions.

== Background ==
Radiopaedia was started as a past-time project to store radiology notes and cases online by the Australian neuroradiologist Associate Professor Frank Gaillard in December 2005, while he was a radiology resident. Gaillard previously had tried to print out films but they were bulky to carry. He also experimented with saving digital images on thumb drive or hard drives but found that it was difficult to keep track on them. Gaillard built a Linux server to host the site. He then programmed the site using MediaWiki, the same program platform as Wikipedia.

Gaillard decided to release it on the web, advocating free dissemination of knowledge. The domain name for radiopaedia.org was registered on 11 January 2007. Gaillard initially allowed the site to be freely editable by anyone. Together with Maryanne McHugh from Toshiba Australia, Gaillard funded the bandwidth of the website.

The Radiopaedia.org platform and text content are owned by Radiopaedia Australia Pty Ltd, a privately held company for which Gaillard is the chief executive officer. One of its investors is Investling and its revenue derives from ads, courses, and paid supporters. For image content, contributors reserve some rights and license the content to Radiopaedia and its users under a Creative Commons license.

In 2010, almost all of the article and image collection from radswiki (a similar wiki-based radiology educational site) was donated to Radiopaedia.

== Purpose ==
Radiopaedia’s mission is "to create the best radiology reference the world has ever seen and to make it available for free, for ever, for all." Its intention is to benefit the radiology community and wider society and it relies on benevolent collaborations from radiologists and others with an interest in medical imaging. Most of the content is shared under a Creative Commons non-commercial license.

Similarly to Wikipedia, registered users of the site are allowed to freely add and edit the majority of the content. This allows content to be progressively upgraded over years and for radiologists and society, in general, to continuously refine article content through time. The site also allows registered users to maintain their own personal case library of teaching cases. Rather than individually publishing articles, users are encouraged to integrate content with links to cases and journal articles and collaboratively refine content. In an attempt to reduce vandalism and to peer-review content, an editorial board moderates changes to ensure that the presented material is as accurate and relevant as possible.

A survey done in 2020 shows that 90% of on-call radiology trainees in the United States are using Radiopedia and StatDx as the first and second line options to help them during their work. Educational benefit was also demonstrated when integrating Radiopedia-based training in medical curriculum.

Another recent study done in 2023 among of 286 radiology residents in India by Humsheer Sethi found Radiopaedia to be the most commonly preferred online resource during on-call duties, with 56.6% of respondents selecting it as their first choice. Its accessibility, case-based content, concise information and coverage of current classifications were cited as reasons for its use.

== Subsites ==
Radiopaedia also maintains several subsites, including:

- Radiology Signs - a tumblr feed with selected signs
- Radiology Channel - a YouTube channel containing educational videos

== Editorial team ==
The editorial team develop as well as help users to maintain the high-quality content of the website.

The current editorial board (2024) is composed of individuals from a variety of countries and includes:

Editor-in-chief

- Henry Knipe

Academic director

- Andrew Dixon

Community director

- Jeremy Jones

Founder

- Frank Gaillard

Managing editors

- Andrew Murphy
- Joachim Feger
- Vikas Shah

== iOS apps ==
In 2009, the first Radiopaedia iOS app series was released in two volumes. These apps packaged cases and articles for users to review and have sample questions and answers. More volumes were released subsequently.

All the iOS apps were discontinued after March 2018. Instead, cases in the iOS apps exist in the form of "iOS case packs" playlists on the website.
