= Aspartylglucosaminuria =

- Other names: Glycosylasparaginase deficiency
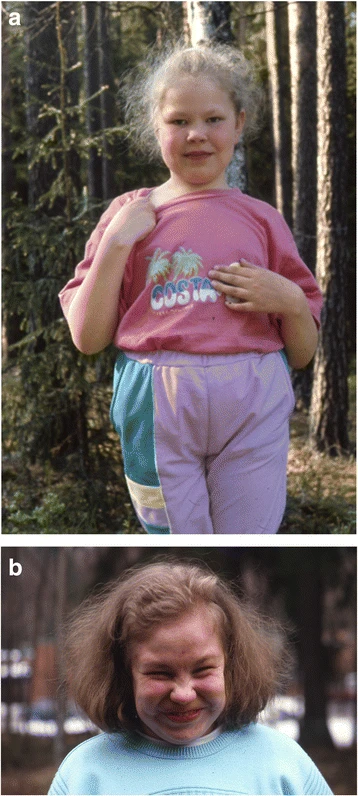
- This illustration shows patient with Aspartylglucosaminuria, with typical facial features such as: puffy eyelids, hypertelorism, a short and broad nose with round nares.
- Specialty: Medical genetics, endocrinology

Aspartylglucosaminuria (AGU) is an inherited disease that is characterized by a decline in mental functioning, accompanied by an increase in skin, bone and joint issues. AGU is an autosomal recessive disease.

The disease is caused by a defect in an enzyme known as aspartylglucosaminidase. This enzyme plays a significant role in our bodies because it aids in breaking down certain sugars (for example, oligosaccharides) that are attached to specific proteins (for example, glycoproteins). Aspartylglucosaminuria itself is characterized as a lysosomal disease because it does deal with inadequate activity in an enzyme's function. Aspartylglucosaminidase functions to break down glycoproteins. These proteins are most abundant in the tissues of the body and in the surfaces of major organs, such as the liver, spleen, thyroid and nerves. When glycoproteins are not broken down, aspartylglucosaminidase backs up in the lysosomes along with other substances. This backup causes progressive damage to the tissues and organs.

== Signs and symptoms ==
At birth, there is no sign that a child will develop symptoms of aspartylglucosaminuria. Typically, signs and symptoms become apparent between two and four years of age and become progressively worse as the individual ages. The following signs and symptoms may appear:

- Individuals are more prone to respiratory infections
- Development of scoliosis
- Seizures or difficulty with movement
- Skin and joints may become loose
- Facial features change progressively; this may include:

1. thickening of the skin
2. features becoming more prominent
3. large head
4. broad lower jaw
5. short, broad nose
6. rounded cheeks

- Progression of developmental and mental disabilities, including:

1. progressive loss of speech
2. decrease in mental functioning
3. before school age, concentration lowers
4. development continues, but becomes slower than usual

- An intellectual peak occurs in the mid-teens and allows a plateau for the disease. Once an individual hits the age of 25–30 the decrease begins again, including:

1. learned skills become lost which result in severe learning disabilities
2. motor skills deteriorate
3. individuals become less mobile and more dependent

(Children are physically uncoordinated, but remain able to play sports and do everyday activities until they reach adulthood.)

- During the first year of life inguinal and umbilical hernias are common.
- Less severe symptoms include:

1. enlargement of the spleen and liver
2. diarrhea

- People with aspartylglucosaminuria may have lower than average height, because they tend to go through puberty earlier.
- Epilepsy may develop in adulthood.
- Finnish studies have shown that life expectancy is shorter than average.

== Genetics ==
Aspartylglucosaminuria is an autosomal recessive genetic condition that is inherited from both parents. The AGU patient is born with two copies of the mutated AGA gene. One copy comes from the mother's egg and the other copy comes from the father's sperm. In order to develop aspartylglucosaminuria, the individual must inherit changes in both of his AGU genes (autonomic recessive inheritance). When a person receives one changed form of the gene AGU from one of the parents, the individual is then classified as a carrier.

== Diagnosis ==
In order to be diagnosed with AGU an individual takes a urine test, which will show indication of an increased amount of aspartylglucosamin being secreted. The confirmation of the diagnosis of aspartylglucosaminuria requires a blood test. This helps show if the enzyme aspartylglucosaminidase is present or partially absent. A skin sample will also show the amount of aspartylglucosaminidase present.

=== Pre-natal diagnosis ===
When families have a child who has already been diagnosed with AGU, they have the option to observe the enzyme's activity that codes for AGU in future pregnancy, to help determine if the next child will also have a positive diagnosis for aspartylglucosaminuria.

== Treatment ==
No treatment is available to cure or slow down the progression of aspartylglucosaminuria. Bone marrow transplants have been conducted in hope that the bone marrow will produce the missing enzyme. The results of the tests thus far have shown to be inconclusive.

=== Preventions/interventions to signs and symptoms ===
It will be beneficial to children who are diagnosed with AGU to receive an education from a school with special teaching.

=== Habilitation ===
The process of habilitation for individuals diagnosed with AGU needs to be established in their early stages of life. The team for habilitation should include professionals who are experienced in disabilities and the effects that having a disability can have on everyday life. Habilitation will include assessments, assistance with the choice of aids, and information concerning disabilities and counseling.

== Prognosis ==
Individuals with AGU typically have normal development in infancy. Around the age of 2–4 years, they begin showing signs of developmental delay, but development is still progressing. Initial symptoms may present as clumsiness and/or speech delay. Individuals with AGU also show increased upper respiratory infections. Development continues until about puberty; however, an individual at 13–16 years of age typically shows mental and motor development similar to a 5-6 year old. Around puberty, a gradual decline in mental abilities and motor skills occurs. This progressive decline continues until about age 25–28, when rapid impairment of abilities occurs, resulting in severe intellectual disability.

== Epidemiology ==
Aspartylglucosaminuria is estimated to affect 1 in 18,500 people in Finland. This condition is less common in other countries, but the incidence is unknown. Even though this disease can occur in various races and ethnicities, another study backed this finding up by stating that 1 in 26,000 people in Finland had the disease and that 1 in 18,000 were carriers.

After trisomy 21 and fragile X syndrome, this is the most frequent multiple congenital anomaly/intellectual disability syndrome in Finland.

== See also ==
- Inborn error of metabolism
