= Gastroschisis =

Defect resulting in visible intestines

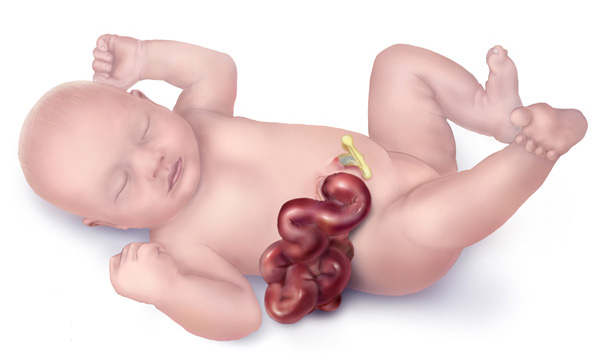
- CDC illustration of a baby with gastroschisis
- Pronunciation: /ɡæˈstrɒskɪsɪs/
- Specialty: General surgery, medical genetics
- Symptoms: Intestines extend outside of the body through a hole next to the belly button
- Complications: Feeding problems, prematurity, intrauterine growth restriction
- Usual onset: During early development
- Causes: Unknown
- Risk factors: Mother who smokes, drinks alcohol, or is younger than 20
- Diagnostic method: Ultrasound during pregnancy, based on symptom at birth
- Differential diagnosis: Omphalocele, prune belly syndrome
- Treatment: Early surgery
- Frequency: 4 per 10,000 births

Gastroschisis is a birth defect in which the baby's intestines extend outside of the abdomen through a hole next to the belly button. The size of the hole is variable, and other organs including the stomach and liver may also occur outside the baby's body. Complications may include feeding problems, prematurity, intestinal atresia, and intrauterine growth restriction.

The cause is typically unknown. Rates are higher in babies born to mothers who smoke, drink alcohol, or are younger than 20 years old. Ultrasounds during pregnancy may make the diagnosis. Otherwise, diagnosis occurs at birth. It differs from omphalocele in that there is no covering membrane over the intestines.

Treatment involves surgery. This typically occurs shortly after birth. In those with large defects, the exposed organs may be covered with a special material and slowly moved back into the abdomen. This condition affects about 4 per 10,000 newborns. Rates of the condition appear to be increasing.

== Signs and symptoms ==
There are no signs during pregnancy. About sixty percent of infants with gastroschisis are born prematurely. At birth, the baby will have a relatively small (<4cm) hole in the abdominal wall, usually just to the right of the belly button. Some of the intestines are usually outside the body, passing through this opening. In rare circumstances, the liver and stomach may also come through the abdominal wall. After birth, these organs are directly exposed to air.

== Causes ==
The cause of gastroschisis is not known. There may be genetic causes in some cases, and there may be environmental factors to which the mother is exposed during pregnancy.

Risk factors include the mother being young, and use of alcohol or tobacco.

== Pathophysiology ==
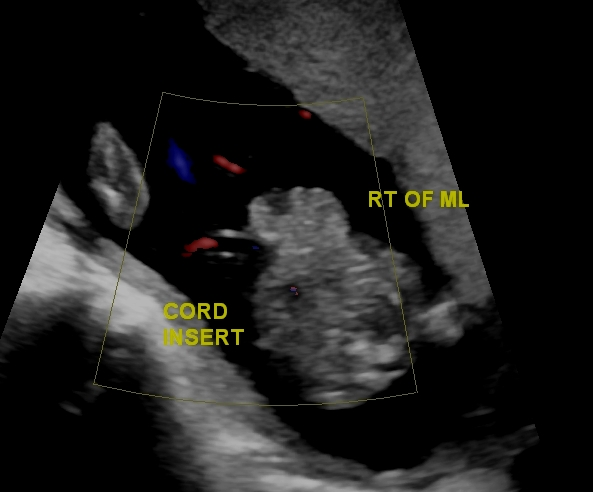
Gastroschisis in ultrasound; defect is to the right of the midline.

During the fourth week of human embryonic development, the lateral body wall folds of the embryo meet at the midline and fuse together to form the anterior body wall. However, in gastroschisis and other anterior body wall defects, this fails to occur due to either one or both of the lateral body wall folds not moving properly to meet with the other and fuse. This incomplete fusion results in a defect that allows abdominal organs to protrude through the abdominal wall, and the intestines typically herniate through the rectus abdominis muscle, lying to the right of the umbilicus. The forces responsible for the movement of the lateral body wall folds are poorly understood, and a better understanding of these forces would help to explain why gastroschisis occurs mostly to the right of the umbilicus, while other ventral body wall defects occur in the midline.

At least six hypotheses have been proposed for the pathophysiology:

1. Failure of mesoderm to form in the body wall
2. Rupture of the amnion around the umbilical ring with subsequent herniation of bowel
3. Abnormal involution of the right umbilical vein leading to weakening of the body wall and gut herniation
4. Disruption of the right vitelline (yolk sac) artery with subsequent body wall damage and gut herniation
5. Abnormal folding of the body wall resulting in a ventral body wall defect through which the gut herniates
6. Failure to incorporate the yolk sac and related vitelline structures into the umbilical stalk

The first hypothesis does not explain why the mesoderm defect would occur in such a specific small area. The second hypothesis does not explain the low percentage of associated abnormality compared with omphalocele. The third hypothesis was criticized due to no vascular supplement of anterior abdominal wall by umbilical vein. The fourth hypothesis was commonly accepted, but it was later shown that the right vitelline artery (right omphalomesenteric artery) did not supply the anterior abdominal wall in this area. More evidence is needed to support the fifth hypothesis.

== Diagnosis ==
In the developed world, around 90% of cases are identified during normal ultrasound screens, usually in the second trimester.

Distinguished from other ventral body wall defects such as omphalocele, there is no overlying sac or peritoneum, and the defect is usually much smaller in gastroschisis.

== Treatment ==
Gastroschisis requires surgical treatment to return the exposed intestines to the abdominal cavity and close the hole in the abdomen. Sometimes this is done immediately but more often the exposed organs are covered with sterile drapings, and only later is the surgery done. Affected newborns frequently require more than one surgery, as only about 10% of cases can be closed in a single surgery.

Given the urgent need for surgery after birth, it is recommended that delivery occur at a facility equipped for caring for these high-risk neonates, as transfers to other facilities may increase risk of adverse outcomes. There is no evidence that cesarean deliveries lead to better outcomes for babies with gastroschisis, so cesarean delivery is only considered if there are other indications.

The main cause for lengthy recovery periods is the time taken for the infant's bowel function to return to normal. After surgery infants are fed through IV fluids and gradually introduced to normal feeding.

== Prognosis ==
Gastroschisis, Siriraj Medical Museum

If left untreated, gastroschisis is fatal to the infant; however, in adequate settings the survival rate for treated infants is 90%.

Most risks of gastroschisis are related to decreased bowel function. Sometimes blood flow to the exposed organs is impaired or there is less than the normal amount of intestine. This may put infants at risk for other dangerous conditions such as necrotizing enterocolitis. Also, because their intestines are exposed, infants with gastroschisis are at increased risk for infection, and must be closely monitored. Morbidity is strongly influenced by associated malformations, intestinal complications, and the frequent need for multiple operations. Neonatal mortality is higher in premature infants, in those with two or more concurrent complications, and in cases with an Apgar score below 7 at five minutes.

After surgery a child with gastroschisis will have some degree of intestinal malrotation. About 1% of children will experience a midgut volvulus after surgery.

== Epidemiology ==
As of 2015 the worldwide incidence was about 2 to 5 per 10,000 live births, and this number seemed to be increasing.

As of 2017 the CDC estimates that about 1,871 babies are born each year in the United States with gastroschisis.

== See also ==
- Smoking and pregnancy
