= Umbilical granuloma =

Abnormality in newborn children

Umbilical granuloma is the most common umbilical abnormality in newborn children or neonates, causing inflammation and drainage. It may appear in the first few weeks of newborn infants during the healing process of the umbilical cord due to an umbilical mass. It is the overgrowth of the umbilical tissue. It develops in about 1 out of 500 newborns. With appropriate treatment, it is expected to heal in 1~2 weeks.

== Causes ==
Following umbilical cord clamping during delivery, the umbilicus base will spontaneously separate within 7–15 days. With routine cord care and proper hygienic conditions, the remaining umbilical base will heal and new skin tissue will form. In some instances, a mass of tissue, or granuloma, will form at the base.

Umbilical granulomas occur after umbilical cord removal when the remaining ring of the umbilicus undergoes incomplete wound healing and there is excessive healing tissue, also known as granulation tissue.

Delayed cord separation, mild infections and hygienic conditions are all factors which may contribute to the incidence of umbilical granuloma. Although the exact cause of umbilical granulomas is unknown, it is hypothesized that inflammation of the remaining umbilical stump drives skin cell division, resulting in a tissue mass, rather than proper healing at the site.

=== Histophysiology ===
An umbilical granuloma is a physiological response which surpasses the normal processes of skin restoration following umbilical cord clamping. Once the skin lesion is formed, there is an excess of fibroblast production. These fibroblasts, or connective tissue cells, are responsible for the production of collagen and additional fibers, resulting in the excess tissue mass found in the granuloma. Additional histological studies reveal an increase of cell division of vascular endothelial cells. These cells line our blood vessels and are further responsible for the growth and development of tissue and the formation of new blood vessels within the granuloma.

=== Pathophysiology ===
Inflammatory saprophytic microorganisms, involved with decomposition, may delay the healing process, and can lead to overproduction of fibroblasts that are involved in normal skin restoration. These microorganisms can interfere with the skin's normal flora, and lead to increased pathogenic inflammation that leads to delayed epithelialization and the formation of granulomas with excessive blood vessels, fibroblasts, and mucus.

== Signs and symptoms ==
Umbilical granulomas appear as round, pink lumps found at the base of the umbilicus after the removal of the umbilical cord. It appears small, pink/red, and moist due to cord separation. They are usually 1–10 mm in size, however grow in size if they are not treated. Umbilical granulomas are also painless since they do not contain nerve fibers. In some cases, they may contain an odorless discharge, or may be covered in a clear mucus. The surrounding skin of the infant's umbilicus site will appear normal.

Umbilical granulomas can become entry points for infectious agents. Symptoms such as edema, redness around the umbilical site, pain or discomfort when the area is touched, accompanied by a fever and purulent discharge, may indicate sepsis or a serious infection at the umbilicus site.

== Diagnosis ==
Umbilical granuloma can be diagnosed from physical examination. If there is a discharge around the navel and the granulation tissue is large enough to be visible with the open eye, umbilical granuloma is the first to be suspected. Open eye inspection and/or dermoscopy is commonly used to recognize the granular tissue at the site. If the granuloma is not visible with the open eye, gentle pressure on the surrounding site or a surgical tweezer can be used to expose the small granuloma hidden within the umbilical pit. An otoscope may also be used by physicians in order to expose a small, sessile granuloma. Other additional tests are usually not required, but if continued, ultrasonography (US) can be used for initial diagnosis of umbilical lesions.

== Treatment ==
=== Topical ===
Although there is no singular method of treatment for umbilical granulomas, some treatment options available include common salt, silver nitrate, corticosteroids, and cleaning with alcohol. Home care following treatments include gentle cleaning the navel area with soap and sterile water, followed by open exposure of the belly button to air.

==== Silver nitrate ====
Silver nitrate is the most common treatment and practiced worldwide. Neonatology textbooks suggest silver nitrate as a first-line treatment option. The application of silver nitrate to granulomas was first noted in early 1800s as a cauterizing agent.

Silver nitrate can be used as an antiseptic, an astringent, and as a caustic agent, depending on the indication. Its application requires medical personnel for treatment and may have unfavorable adverse effects if applied improperly. In the treatment of umbilical granulomas, silver nitrate is applied to the umbilical site to burn off the excess tissue. The absence of nerve endings within the granuloma make this a painless treatment for the newborn. While painless, contact of silver nitrate to the adjacent, healthy, normal tissue may result in burns. Silver nitrate application to the infected site should not exceed three applications with an interval of 3–4 days. In this event, alternative treatments should be considered Following treatment with silver nitrate, the granuloma is expected to shrink and resolve within 7 days.

=== Double-ligature treatment ===
In cases with deeply located umbilical granulomas, the double-ligature technique can be utilized to ligate the base of the granuloma. The procedure involves prepping and sterilizing the umbilical area with iodine solution, placing a silk suture around the base of the lesion to keep in place, and finally placing a more exact ligature around the granuloma. Much like the normal process of umbilical cord residue healing, the ligated granuloma will necrose due to lack of blood supply and will fall off naturally within 1 to 2 weeks. Minor complications of this technique include minimal bleeding and possibly requiring more ligatures than the original double ligation.

=== Cryocautery ===
Cryocautery can be utilized to freeze the umbilical granuloma by using cryogenic nitrous oxide along with other equipment. During cryocautery procedures, the umbilical site is first cleaned. The physician will then hold a cyroprobe with nitrous oxide as a refrigerant directly to the granuloma for 3 minutes. One risk of utilizing this technique is burning the skin surrounding the granuloma. Following the procedure, the naval site is cleansed, left exposed to the air and the infant is discharged.

Cyrocautery is more commonly used for freezing for post hysterectomy granulation tissue. However, though more expensive and complex, cryosurgery is an effective treatment for the indication of umbilical granulomas in infants as well.

== Prevention ==
=== Newborn naval care ===
In order to reduce the possibility of an infection or inflammation at the umbilical site, the World Health Organization (WHO) has advocated for the use of dry umbilical cord care in high resource settings. Dry cord care includes keeping the newborn's umbilical area clean and exposed to air or loosely covered by a clean cloth. The remainder of the umbilicus should be cleaned once daily with soap and sterile water. Chlorhexidine is recommended in substitute of sterile water for areas in which infection risks are high.

Diaper positioning can also influence infection risk. Keeping the diaper area clean and reducing moisture at the site can reduce the chance of developing an infection. Aim to position the diaper by rolling the top portion down to sit under the navel, keeping the site open and exposed to air.

=== Cord clamping technique ===
The incidence of umbilical granuloma may be influenced by the method of cord clamping. It has been suggested that proximal cord clamping of the umbilical cord for 24 hours reduces the chance of infection at the naval site compared to other cord clamping practices.

==== Timing ====
Umbilical cord clamping timing can vary in time intervals. Early clamping is categorized as within the first 60 seconds after birth, whereas late umbilical cord clamping is classified as more than one minute after the birth. There is no evidence indicating that time to umbilical cord clamping has had an effect on umbilical granuloma formation or on additional neonatal morbidity outcomes.

== Complications ==
If an infection occurs, omphalitis may occur.

=== Recurrence risk ===
The various treatment modalities of umbilical granuloma result in various recurrence risks. In a systematic review, following infants through weeks 1, 3 and 6 post-treatment for umbilical granuloma, newborns treated with silver nitrate presented with a 9% recurrence risk, whereas newborns treated with common salt presented null recurrence.

== See also ==
- Teratoma
- List of cutaneous conditions
