= Aspartylglucosaminidase =

Protein-coding gene in the species Homo sapiens

AGA
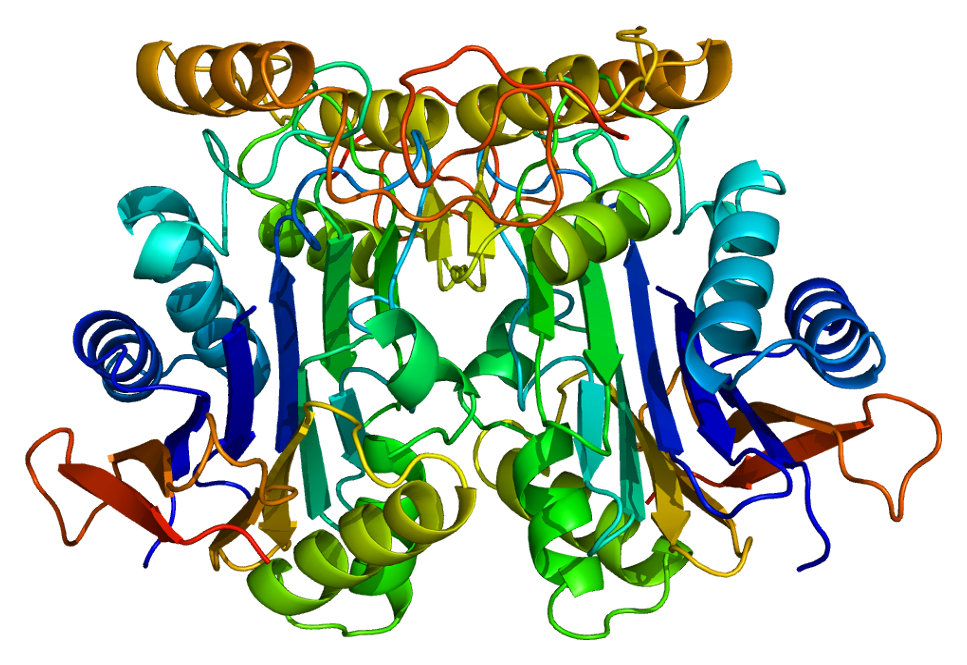

Identifiers
- Aliases: AGA, Aga, AW060726, AGU, ASRG, GA, aspartylglucosaminidase
- External IDs: OMIM: 613228; MGI: 104873; GeneCards: AGA
Available structures
PDB	Ortholog search: PDBe RCSB
PDB	List of PDB id codes 1APY, 1APZ
Enzyme activity
EC #	BRENDA	ExPASy	KEGG	MetaCyc
3.5.1.26	↗	↗	↗	↗

Gene location (Human)
Chr.	Chromosome 4 (human)
Band	4q34.3	Start	177,430,774 bp
Band	4q34.3	End	177,442,437 bp

Gene location (Mouse)
Chr.	Chromosome 8 (mouse)
Band	8|8 B1.3	Start	53,964,762 bp
Band	8|8 B1.3	End	53,976,456 bp
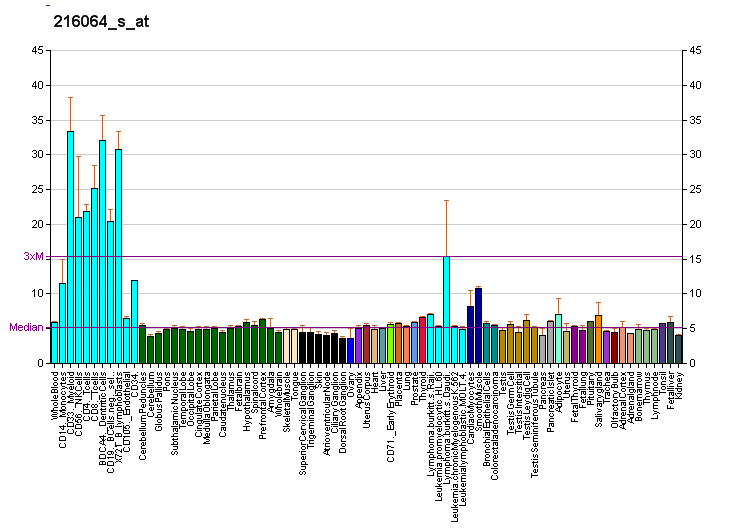

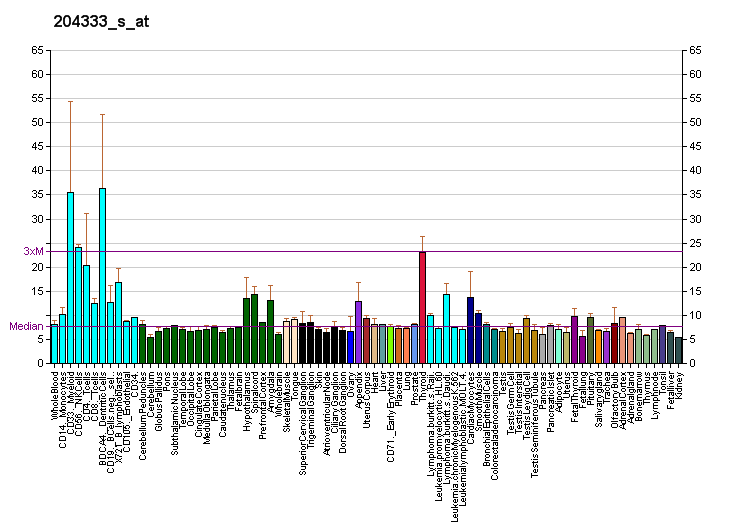

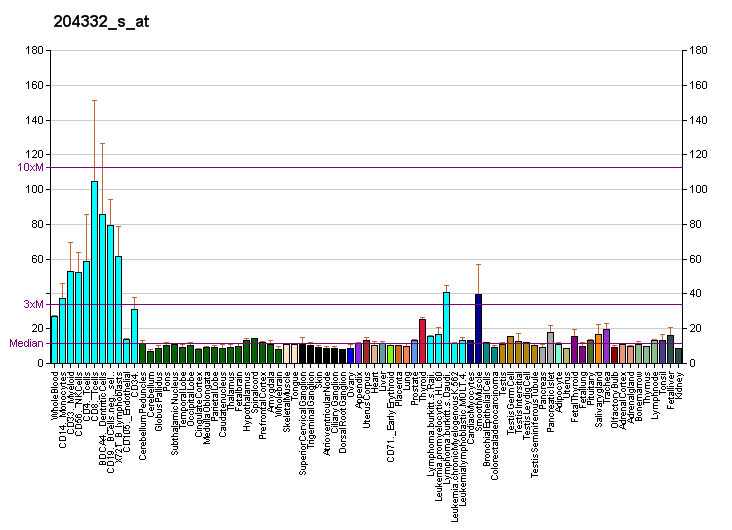
RNA expression pattern
Bgee	Human / Mouse (ortholog); Top expressed in: corpus epididymis; gingival epithelium; gonad; skin of hip; stromal cell of endometrium; skin of thigh; oral cavity; islet of Langerhans; parotid gland; kidney tubule / Top expressed in: calvaria; ascending aorta; otolith organ; utricle; pituitary gland; aortic valve; epithelium of lens; stroma of bone marrow; right kidney; lobe of prostate; More reference expression data
BioGPS	More reference expression data
Gene ontology
Molecular function	protein self-association; peptidase activity; hydrolase activity; N4-(beta-N-acetylglucosaminyl)-L-asparaginase activity
Cellular component	lysosome; endoplasmic reticulum; extracellular region; extracellular space; azurophil granule lumen; cytoplasm
Biological process	protein maturation; protein deglycosylation; proteolysis; neutrophil degranulation
Sources:Amigo / QuickGO
Orthologs
Databases	NCBI: entry; OMA: entry
Species	Human	Mouse
Entrez	175	11593
Ensembl	ENSG00000038002	ENSMUSG00000031521
UniProt	P20933	Q64191
RefSeq (mRNA)	NM_000027; NM_001171988	NM_001005847; NM_001205054
RefSeq (protein)	NP_000018; NP_001165459	NP_001005847; NP_001191983
Location (UCSC)	Chr 4: 177.43 – 177.44 Mb	Chr 8: 53.96 – 53.98 Mb
PubMed search
- Wikidata
View/Edit Human	View/Edit Mouse

N(4)-(beta-N-acetylglucosaminyl)-L-asparaginase is an enzyme that in humans is encoded by the AGA gene.

Aspartylglucosaminidase is an amidohydrolase enzyme involved in the catabolism of N-linked oligosaccharides of glycoproteins. It cleaves asparagine from N-acetylglucosamines as one of the final steps in the lysosomal breakdown of glycoproteins. The lysosomal storage disease aspartylglycosaminuria is caused by a deficiency in the AGA enzyme.
