= Frank Gaillard =

Australian neuroradiologist

- Occupations: Neuroradiologist, medical educator
- Known for: Founding Radiopaedia.org

Frank Gaillard is an Australian neuroradiologist and medical educator. He founded Radiopaedia.org in December 2005 and served as its editor-in-chief until 2024. He works as a consultant neuroradiologist at the Royal Melbourne Hospital and holds a clinical academic appointment at the University of Melbourne.

== Education and career ==
Gaillard graduated from the University of Melbourne medical school in 1998 and trained in radiology at the Royal Melbourne Hospital. He undertook additional neuroradiology fellowship training in Canada and later returned to the Royal Melbourne Hospital as a consultant neuroradiologist. His clinical and research interests include central nervous system tumour imaging and computer-aided MRI interpretation.

== Radiopaedia ==
Gaillard created Radiopaedia.org in 2005 while training in radiology, initially as a way to store and organise digital teaching material, and developed it into an open, collaborative radiology reference and case repository inspired in part by wiki-based models of online knowledge sharing. In academic publishing, Gaillard has disclosed his role as founder, chief executive, and editor of Radiopaedia.org. He has once recounted that Wikipedia was his source for inspiration in creating this resource.

Studies of radiology trainees' information-seeking behaviour have identified Radiopaedia among the commonly used resources in on-call settings.

== Honours ==
In 2021, Gaillard was awarded an Honorary Fellowship of the Royal College of Radiologists (RCR) for contributions to radiology education, including his work on Radiopaedia.org.
