= Umbilical ring =

Details

Identifiers
- Latin: anulus umbilicalis
- TA98: A04.5.01.023
- TA2: 2378
- FMA: 19930

The umbilical ring is a dense fibrous ring surrounding the umbilicus at birth. At about the sixth week of embryological development, the midgut herniates through the umbilical ring; six weeks later it returns to the abdominal cavity and rotates around the superior mesenteric artery.

Dense embryonic connective tissue encircles the attachment of the umbilical cord. It forms an umbilical ring of mesodermal condensation surrounding the coelomic portal, and is present in the 16 mm. embryo, but more emphatically so in the 23 mm. embryo. The compact tissue first appears in the stalk mesoderm, situated superficial to the allantoic vessels. Cranially it lies ventral to the umbilical vein and on each side extends into the tissue of the lateral pillars of the cord bounding the coelom. When the myotomic downgrowths reach the ventral aspect, their anterior portions (i.e. the sheaths of the recti muscles) become continuous with the tissue of the umbilical ring.

== Umbilical hernia ==
When the umbilical ring has failed to close during the gestation (pregnancy) which results in a central defect in the lineal alba. Umbilical hernias are smaller than one centimeter in size that it is present at birth but will only close in four to five years of life. In some cases, hernias do not need any surgical repair but when it is larger in size that protrusion is blighting to the parent and the child, it would require to get an early surgical repair. It is more common in women with increased intra-abdominal pressure during pregnancy.
