= Aspartylglucosamine =

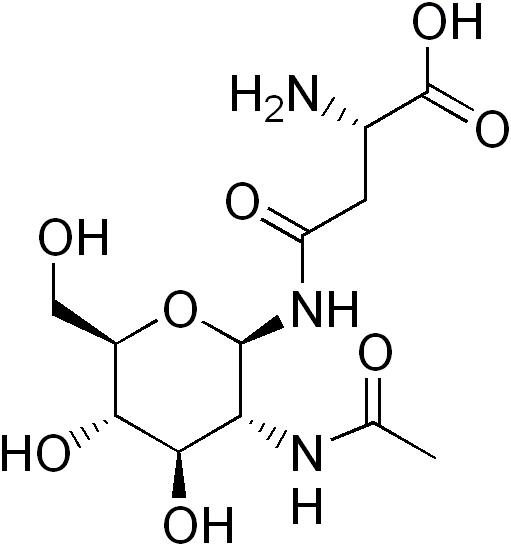

Names
- IUPAC name (2S)-4-[[(2R,3R,4R,5S,6R)-3-Acetamido-4,5-dihydroxy-6-(hydroxymethyl)oxan-2-yl]amino]-2-amino-4-oxobutanoic acid

Identifiers
CAS Number	2776-93-4
3D model (JSmol)	Interactive image
ChEBI	CHEBI:58080
ChemSpider	110370
MeSH	N-acetylglucosaminylasparagine
PubChem CID	123826
UNII	Q9ODP9B8O5
CompTox Dashboard (EPA)	DTXSID401027514
- InChI: InChI=1S/C12H21N3O8/c1-4(17)14-8-10(20)9(19)6(3-16)23-11(8)15-7(18)2-5(13)12(21)22/h5-6,8-11,16,19-20H,2-3,13H2,1H3,(H,14,17)(H,15,18)(H,21,22)/t5-,6+,8+,9+,10+,11+/m0/s1 Key: YTTRPBWEMMPYSW-HRRFRDKFSA-N; InChI=1/C12H21N3O8/c1-4(17)14-8-10(20)9(19)6(3-16)23-11(8)15-7(18)2-5(13)12(21)22/h5-6,8-11,16,19-20H,2-3,13H2,1H3,(H,14,17)(H,15,18)(H,21,22)/t5-,6+,8+,9+,10+,11+/m0/s1 Key: YTTRPBWEMMPYSW-HRRFRDKFBT
- SMILES: CC(=O)N[C@@H]1[C@H]([C@@H]([C@H](O[C@H]1NC(=O)C[C@@H](C(=O)O)N)CO)O)O

Properties
Chemical formula	C_{12}H_{21}N_{3}O_{8}
Molar mass	335.31 g/mol
- Except where otherwise noted, data are given for materials in their standard state (at 25 °C [77 °F], 100 kPa). verify (what is ?) Infobox references

Aspartylglucosamine is a derivative of aspartic acid.

Levels are elevated in aspartylglucosaminuria.
