= Umbilicoplasty =

Plastic surgery procedure

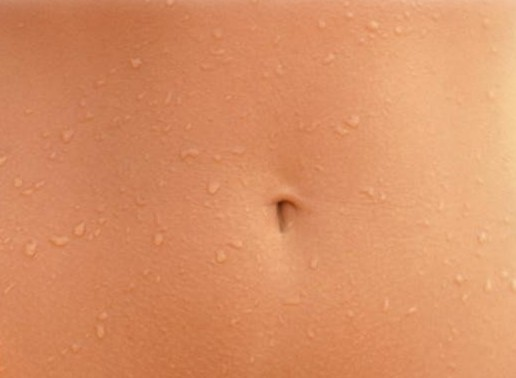
- Umbilicoplasty is a plastic surgery procedure to modify the navel's appearance.
- Other names: Belly button surgery
- Specialty: Plastic surgeon

Umbilicoplasty, sometimes referred to as "belly button surgery", is a plastic surgery procedure to modify the appearance of one's navel (or "belly button"). It may be performed as part of a tummy tuck or lower body lift operation, or it may be performed alone.

== Reasons ==
Candidates typically choose the surgery because they dislike how their navel looks. They may have a protruding or inverted navel, which they may wish to change. Their navel may be as it was from birth, or it may have changed due to unrelated surgery, such as a Caesarean section.

Another fairly common reason is because of dramatic weight loss or pregnancy, which can change the shape of a belly button. Some may have experienced weight gain, weight loss, or pregnancy, causing changes to the shape of the navel. Cosmetic surgeons concede that women between 35 and 45 years of age opting for tummy-tucks and liposuctions immediately following childbirth constitute nearly 25% of their practice.
