= Navel =

Scarred area on the abdomen after detachment of the umbilical cord

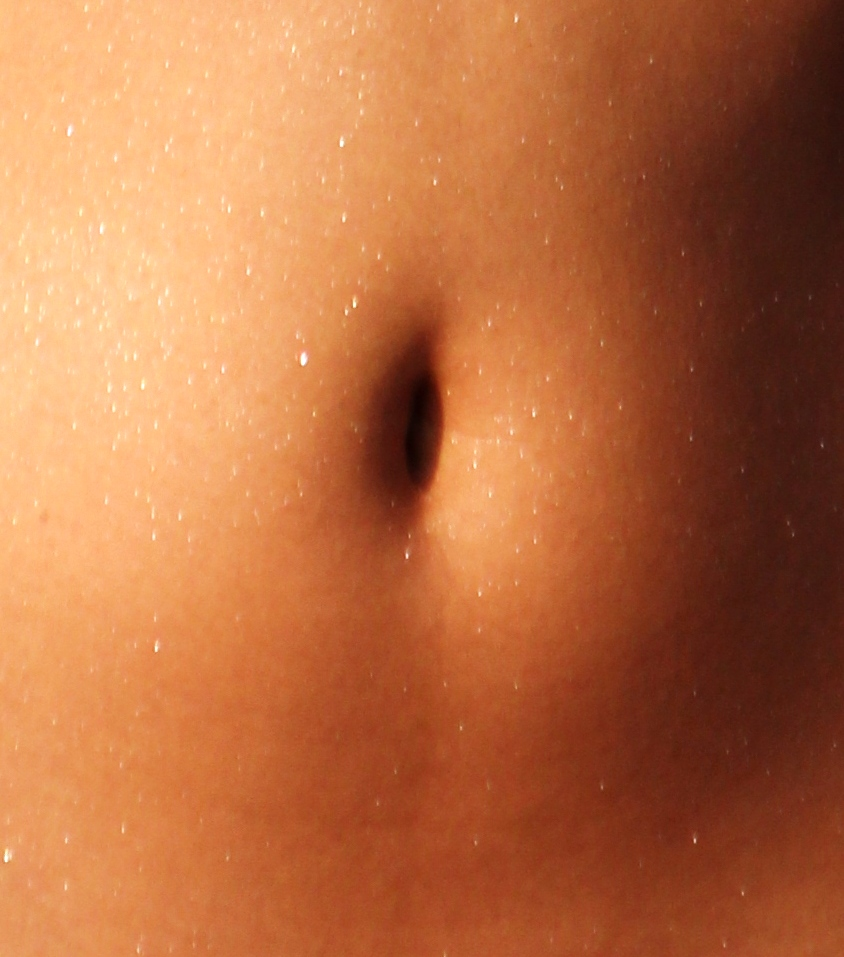
- The navel is a protruding, flat or hollowed scar left after the umbilical cord detaches.

Details
- Precursor: Umbilical cord Ductus venosus
- Artery: Umbilical artery
- Vein: Umbilical vein

Identifiers
- Latin: umbilicus
- MeSH: D014472
- TA98: A01.2.04.005
- TA2: 261
- FMA: 61584

The navel (clinically known as the umbilicus; pl.: umbilici or umbilicuses; also known as the belly button or tummy button) is a protruding, flat, or hollowed area on the abdomen at the attachment site of the umbilical cord.

== Structure ==
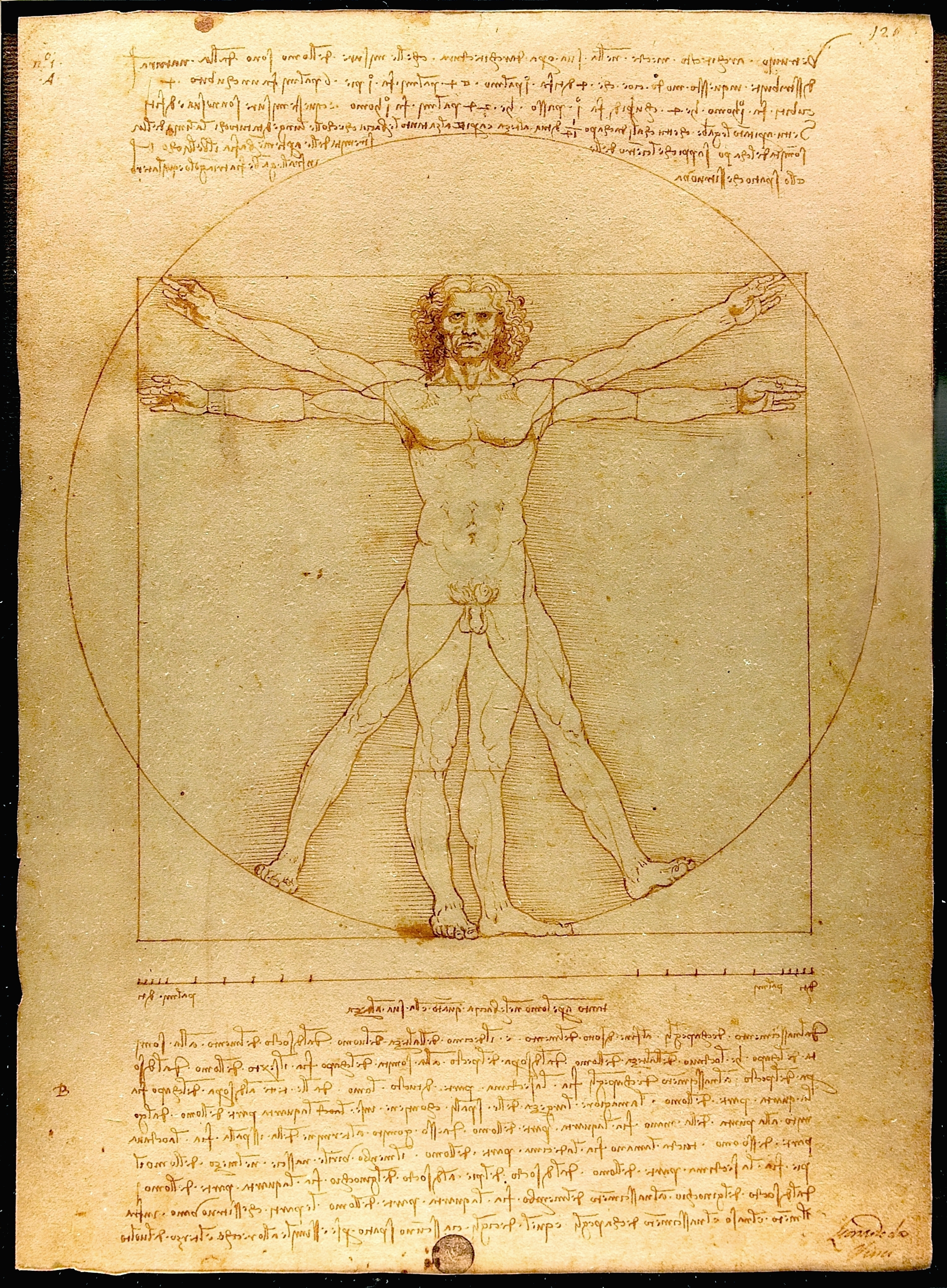
The navel is the centre of the circle in this drawing of the Vitruvian Man by Leonardo da Vinci.

The umbilicus is used to visually separate the abdomen into quadrants.

The umbilicus is a prominent scar on the abdomen, with its position being relatively consistent among humans. The skin around the waist at the level of the umbilicus is supplied by the tenth thoracic spinal nerve (T10 dermatome). The umbilicus itself typically lies at a vertical level corresponding to the junction between the L3 and L4 vertebrae (transumbilical plane), with a normal variation among people between the L3 and L5 vertebrae.

Parts of the adult navel include the "umbilical cord remnant" or "umbilical tip", which is the often protruding scar left by the detachment of the umbilical cord. This is located in the center of the navel, sometimes described as the belly button. Around the cord remnant is the "umbilical collar", formed by the dense fibrous umbilical ring. Surrounding the umbilical collar is the periumbilical skin. Directly behind the navel is a thick fibrous cord formed from the umbilical cord, called the urachus, which originates from the bladder.

The belly button is unique to each individual due to it being a scar, and various general forms have been classified by medical practitioners.

- Outie: A navel consisting of the umbilical tip protruding past the periumbilical skin is an outie. Essentially any navel which is not concave.
  - Swirly/spiral: A rare form in which the umbilical cord scar forms a swirl shape.
  - Split: The protruding umbilical cord scar extends outwards, but is cleft in two by a fissure which extends part or all the way through the umbilical cord scar. This form is similar in appearance to a coffee bean.
  - Protrusion: The umbilical cord remnant is completely divulged, exposing the full umbilical scar.
  - Circlet: Although the entirety of the umbilical cord remnant sits out with the umbilical collar, the centre of the knot is inset by a deep fissure. Unlike a split outie, in this form the fissure is contained centrally and does not extend past the umbilical cord remnant in any direction, much akin to a 'donut' shape.
- Innie: A navel in which the umbilical tip does not protrude past the periumbilical skin. Any navel which is concave.
  - Round: Round navels are completely circular with no hooding.
  - Vertical: Some navels present in the form of a more elongate hollow parallel with the linea alba.
  - Oval: This form consists of three variants; superior hooding, inferior hooding, no hooding.
  - T-shaped: As the name states, the scar is in the shape of a T, and may have superior hooding to various extent.
  - Horizontal: The scar is the least visible, as the natural lines of the tendinous intersection fold over the scar.
- Distorted: Any navel which does not fit well into any of the other categories.
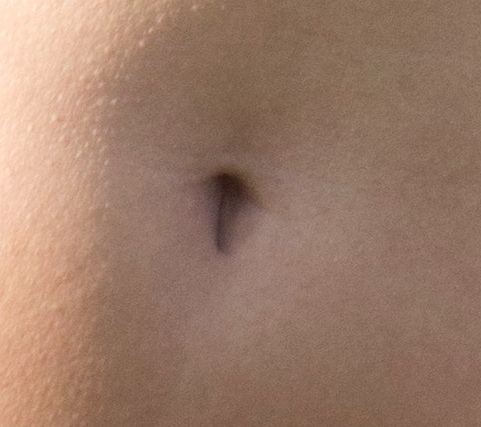
A "T"-shaped "innie" navel

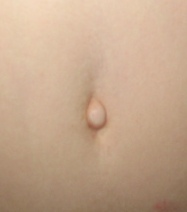
An outie navel

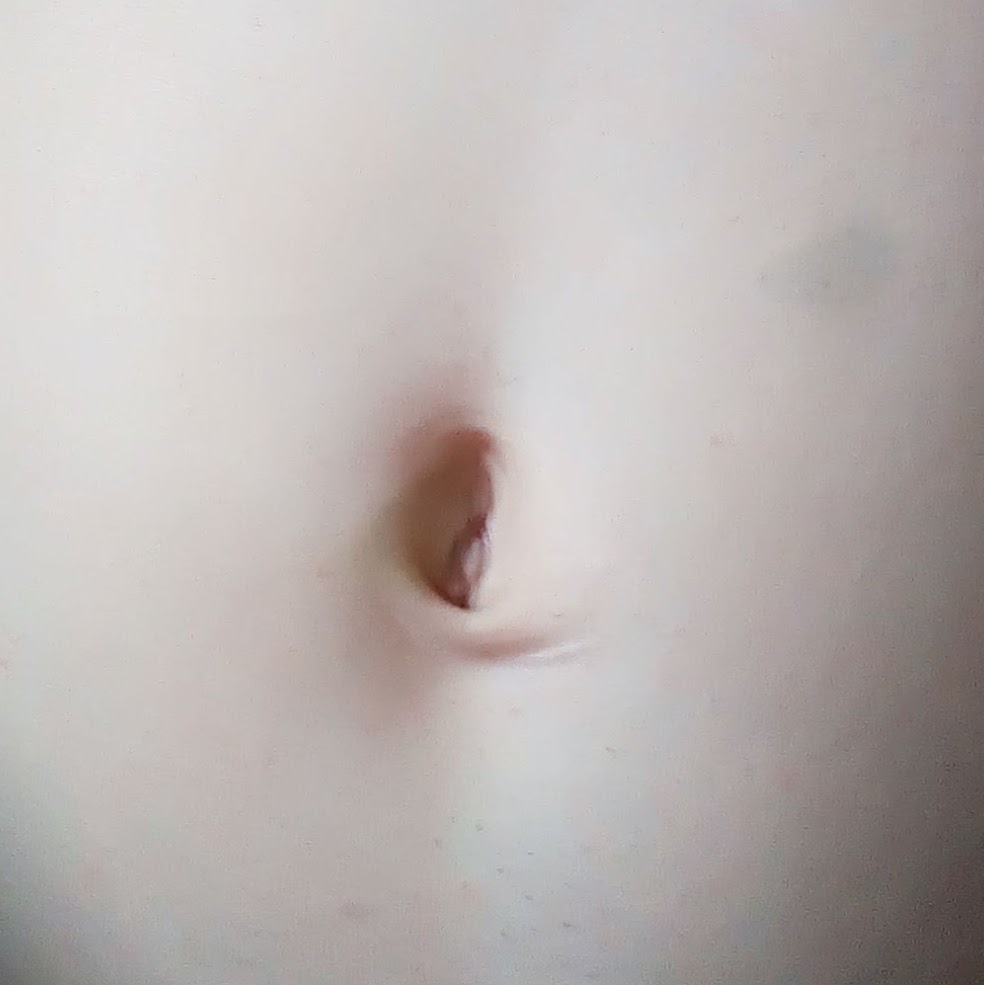
An oval navel

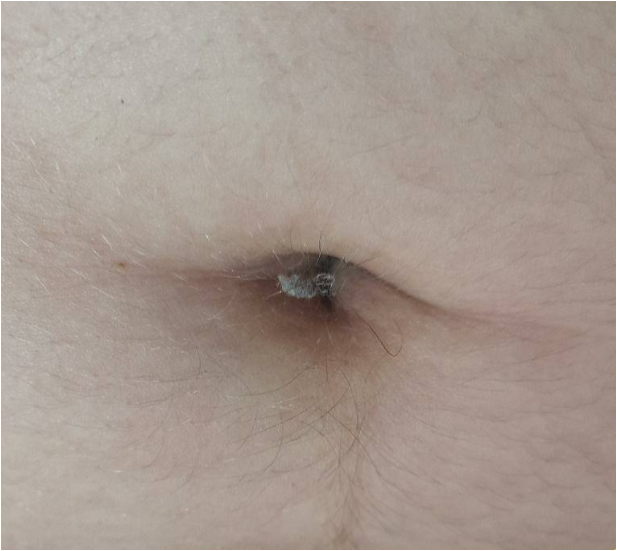
A horizontal navel

== Clinical significance ==
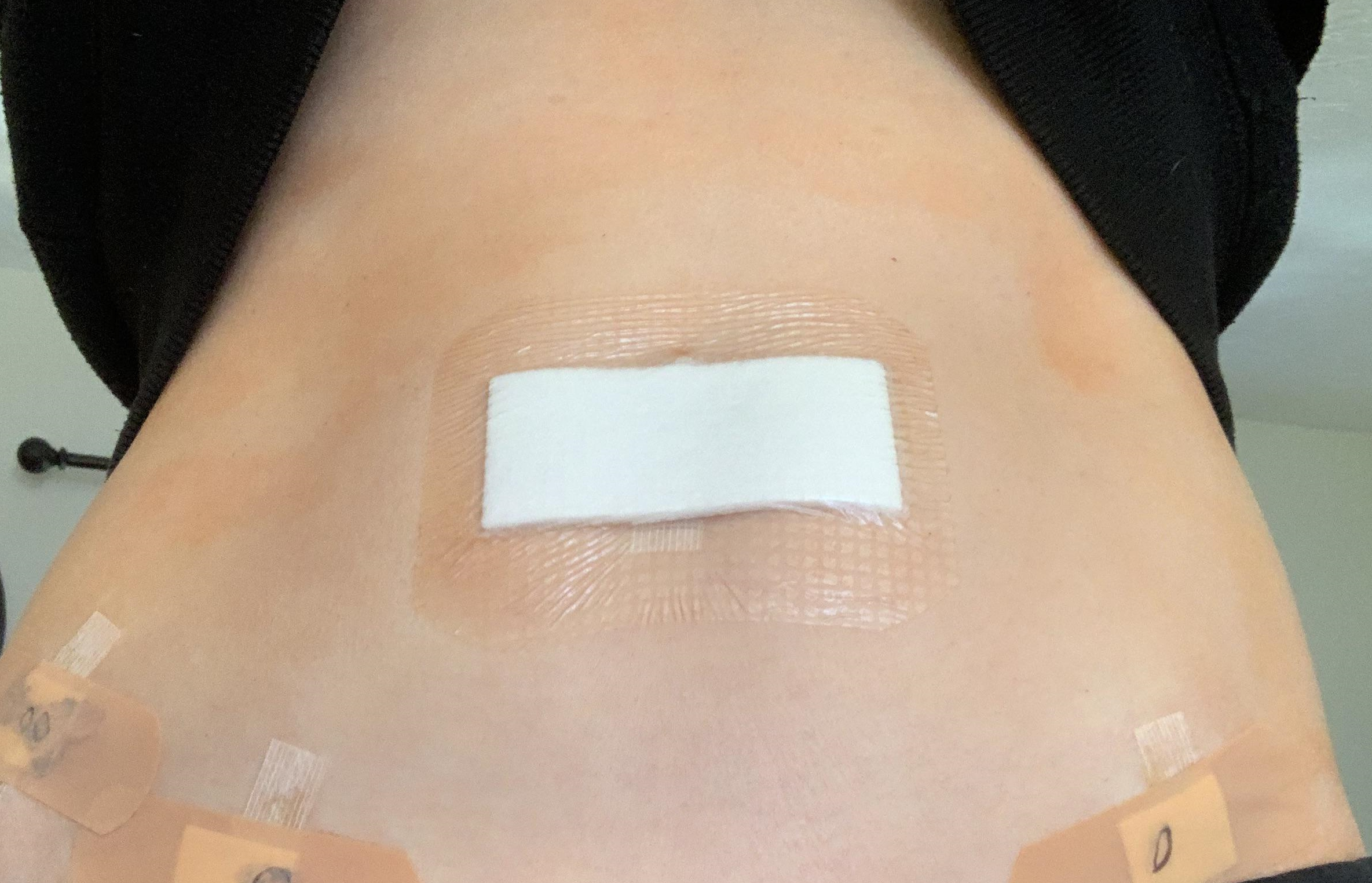
The navel of a female after a laparoscopic procedure

=== Disorders ===
Outies are sometimes mistaken for umbilical hernias; however, they are a completely different shape with no health concern, unlike an umbilical hernia. The navel (specifically abdominal wall) would be considered an umbilical hernia if the protrusion were 5 centimeters or more. The diameter of an umbilical hernia is usually 1/2-inch or more. While the shape of the human navel may be affected by long term changes to diet and exercise, unexpected change in shape may be the result of ascites.

In addition to change in shape being a possible side effect from ascites and umbilical hernias, the navel can be involved in umbilical sinus or fistula, which in rare cases can lead to menstrual or fecal discharge from the navel. Menstrual discharge from the umbilicus is a rare disorder associated with umbilical endometriosis.

=== Other disorders ===
- Omphalitis, an inflammatory condition of the umbilicus in the newborn, usually caused by a bacterial infection.

=== Surgery ===
To minimize scarring, the navel is a recommended site of incision for various surgeries, including transgastric appendicectomy, gall bladder surgery, and the umbilicoplasty procedure itself.

== Other animals ==
All placental mammals have a navel, although it is generally more conspicuous in humans.

Other types of animals can have navels, but their shapes depend on how they are born: for instance, other viviparous (live birthing) animals would have circular navels just like mammals, but in oviparous (egg-laying) animals like birds, the navel is shaped like a line or scar positioned vertically on the abdomen. There is an account of a dinosaur (Psittacosaurus) preserved with a navel, which is shaped like the oviparous type.

== Fashion, society and culture ==
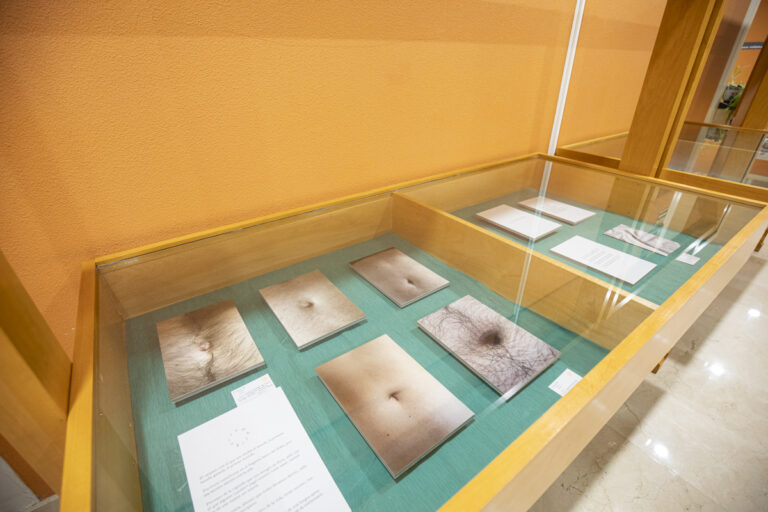
Exhibition featuring photos of writers' navels published in the Spanish cultural magazine Mirlo (no. 0, 2022)

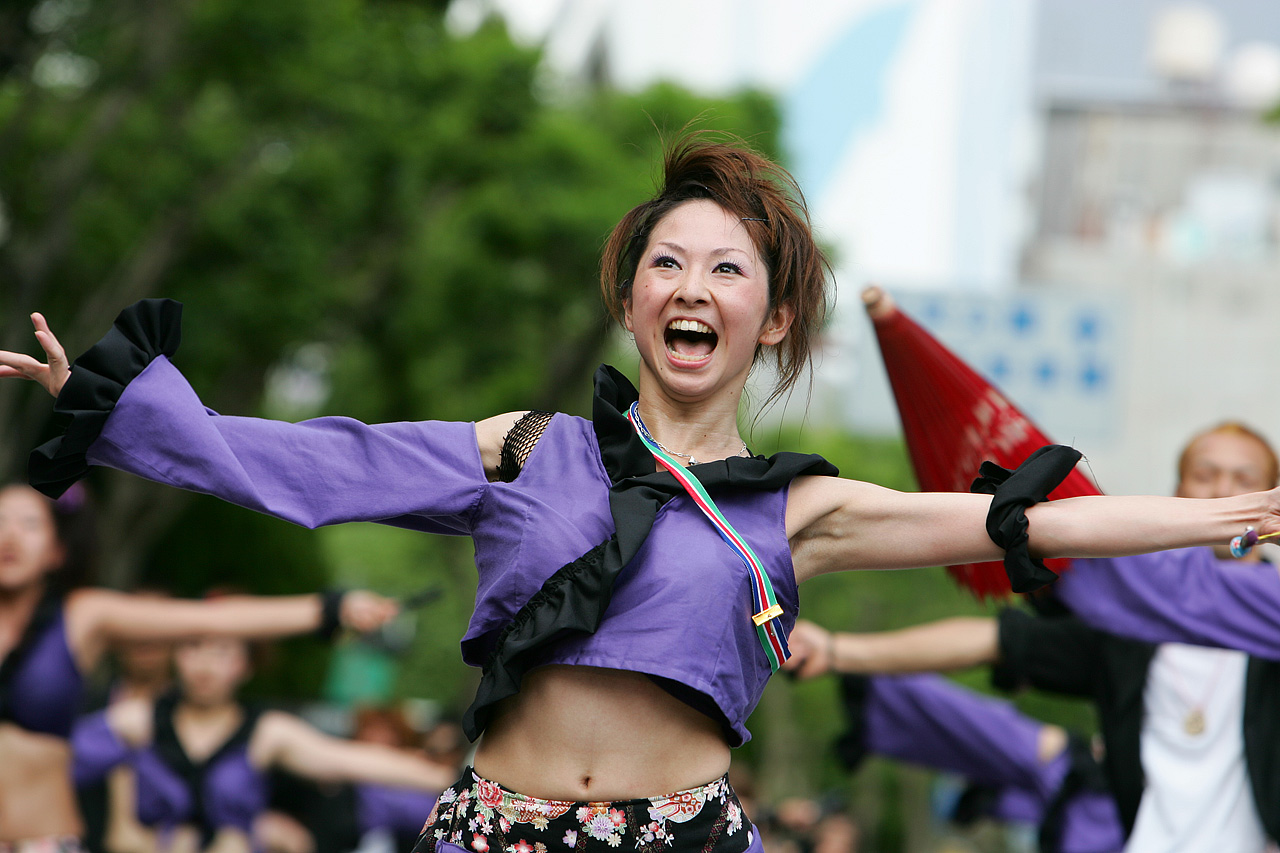
Japanese women performing a traditional Japanese dance Yosakoi in navel-exposing attire in the Yosakoi Matsuri 2006 at Kōchi.

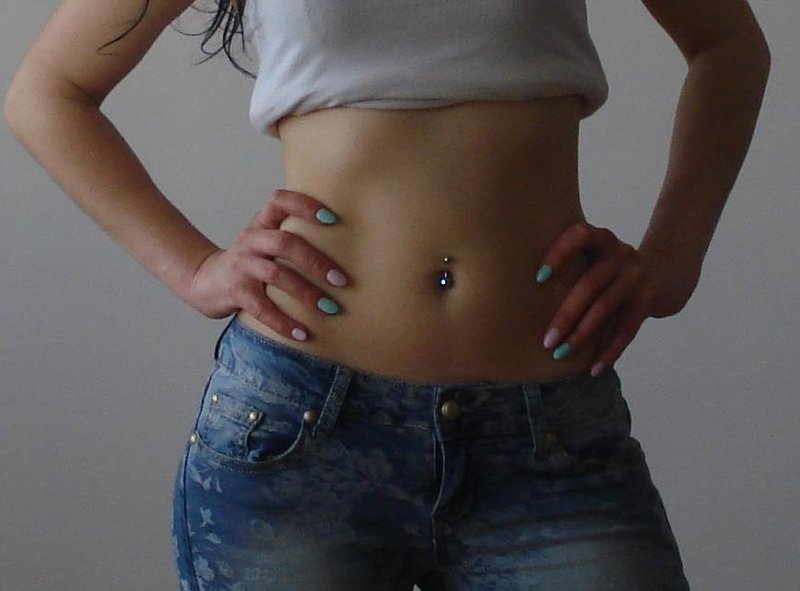
A navel piercing is often accompanied by low-rise pants.

The public exposure of the male and female midriff and bare navel was considered taboo at times in the past in Western cultures, being considered immodest or indecent. Female navel exposure was banned in some jurisdictions, but community perceptions have changed to this now being acceptable. The crop top is a shirt that often exposes the belly button and has become more common among young people. Exposure of the male navel has rarely been stigmatised and has become particularly popular in recent years, due to the strong resurgence of the male crop top and male navel piercing. The navel and midriff are often also displayed in bikinis, or when low-rise pants are worn.

While the West was relatively resistant to navel-baring clothing until the 1980s, it has long been a fashion with Indian women, often displayed with saris or lehengas.

The Japanese have long had a special regard for the navel. During the early Jōmon period in northern Japan, three small balls indicating the breasts and navel were pasted onto flat clay objects to represent the female body. The navel was exaggerated in size, informed by the belief that the navel symbolized the center where life began.

In Arabic-Levantine culture, belly dancing is a popular art form that consists of dance movements focused on the torso and navel.

Buddhism and Hinduism refer to the chakra of the navel as the manipura. In qigong, the navel is seen as the main energy centre, or dantian. In Hinduism, the Kundalini energy is sometimes described as being located at the navel.

== See also ==
- Navel fetishism
- Navel piercing
- Navel lint
- Omphalos
- Umbilical microbiome
- Omphaloskepsis
- Supracristal plane
