= Nobody's Angel (Nobody's Angel album) =

Studio album by Nobody's Angel
- Released: February 1, 2000
- Recorded: 1999–2000
- Genre: Pop
- Length: 49:14
- Label: Hollywood
- Producer: Andrew Logan (exec.), Mike More

Singles from Nobody's Angel
- 1. "If You Wanna Dance" Released: November 23, 1999; 2. "I Just Can't Help Myself" Released: 2000

Nobody's Angel is an eponymous debut studio album by American girl group Nobody's Angel. It was released on February 1, 2000, through Hollywood Records. This pop album was promoted by two singles: "If You Wanna Dance" and "I Just Can't Help Myself". The lead single peaked at number 39 on the Dance Club Songs Billboard chart, and the album reached number 184 on the Billboard 200 chart. Reviews were primarily positive, although some critics labeled the group a guilty pleasure based on the album.

== Background and recording ==
Nobody's Angel members Amy Sue Harding, Sarah Smith, Stacey Harper, and Ali Navarro first met while sharing their stories about unsuccessful auditions in Los Angeles. They decided to form a girl group because of their shared backgrounds in music. The group's name was inspired by Harper's love of the television drama Charlie's Angels. They were one of several new acts signed by Hollywood Records.

Prior to their debut album, they appeared on the television sitcom Boy Meets World and the 2000 television film Model Behavior. They also recorded a cover of "Let's Get Together" for the 1998 film The Parent Trap, which was a remake of the 1961 original. Andrew Logan was the executive producer of the album, which was recorded at A&M Studios and Cardraygee Studios in Hollywood, California. According to Laura Harrell of the Orlando Sentinel, the group members wrote the lyrics and choreographed their dances without assistance. The album was completed in early 1999.

== Composition and sound ==
AllMusic's MacKenzie Wilson said that the album had a "glossy pop sound". Heather Phares of the same publication described the songs as "Disney-generation pop", particularly "If You Wanna Dance". Harrell described the album as being composed of "fast, upbeat pop rhythms as well as slow acoustic ballads". MTV News' Jennifer Armstrong characterized the compositions as based on drums and other sounds effects commonly associated with teen pop.

Phares wrote that the tracks, "Keep Me Away" and "I Can't Help Myself", have a "danceable, youthful style". Armstrong described "Sugardaddy" as having "bopping beats", comparing the group's harmonies to those of the Jackson 5. She felt the cover of the 1979 Sister Sledge song "We Are Family" (1979) was inspired by the Spice Girls. It includes a rap on friendship, with the chorus changed to: "I got all my angels with me."

== Release and promotion ==
Hollywood Records released Nobody's Angel on audio CD and cassette on February 1, 2000; it was also made available as a digital download. The album was initially scheduled for a spring 1999 release. Its cover features the group members posing in front of a pink background, with expressions that Armstrong called "almost unnaturally happy". The group promoted it by performing as an opening act for AJ McLean and the headliner for the Polaroid i-Zone camera tour.

"If You Wanna Dance" was released as the lead single. Marcus Nispel directed the music video, which featured the group ice skating at an ice rink. The song was remixed by Thunderpuss 2000 for radios and clubs. The single received a positive response from critics. Bustle's Kristie Rohwedder referred to it as an "upbeat singalong-friendly pop song". Abby Devora of MTV News wrote that it "definitely had me shaking what my mama gave me as soon as I heard it". However, Harrell described the single "If You Wanna Dance" as "wanna-be" Spice Girls. The song peaked at number 39 on the Dance Club Songs Billboard chart on March 11, 2000, and remained on the chart for seven weeks. Devora included Nobody's Angel on her list of one-hit wonders.

"I Can't Help Myself" was released as the album's second single in 2000; it was made available as a promo CD. A Billboard reviewer wrote that the ballad had "the very essence of a hit-worthy, youth-target single", and praised its melody and the group's harmonies.

== Reception ==
Nobody's Angel received positive reviews. Harrell praised its variety and positively compared the music to NSYNC and Christina Aguilera. She pointed to the group's cover of "We Are Family" as a highlight, saying that the "song is made for dancing and has the coolest tempo". Describing Nobody's Angel as a guilty pleasure, Armstrong wrote that the album had "perfectly blending voices" and "catchy tunes impossible to shake from your memory". Rohwedder thought Nobody's Angel had music worthy of revisiting, though Allie Funk of the same publication wrote that the group and lead single were not relevant.

Nobody's Angel peaked at number 184 on the Billboard 200 chart on July 15, 2000, and remained on the chart for three weeks. It reached number nine of the Heatseekers Album Billboard chart on April 1, 2000, and stayed on the chart for 22 weeks. Harrell considered the album a commercial success.

== Track listing ==
No.	Title	Writer(s)	Producer(s)	Length
1.	"If You Wanna Dance^{a}"	Gregory G. Curtis, Sherree Ford-Payne, Kool & the Gang	Gregory G. Curtis, Andrew Logan	3:43
2.	"I Can't Help Myself"	Andrew Fromm, Sabelle Breer, Sandy Linzer	Andrew Logan, Mike More	3:50
3.	"Boom Boom"	Andrew Logan, Mike More	Andrew Logan, Mike More	3:29
4.	"Next Stop Heaven^{b}"	Andrew Logan, D. Romani, M. Malavasi, Mike More, T. Wiloughby	Andrew Logan, Mike More	3:32
5.	"Keep Me Away"	Andrew Logan, Mike More	Andrew Logan, Mike More	4:17
6.	"Right There Waiting"	Andrew Logan, Mike More	Andrew Logan, Mike More, Jeff Lorber (add.)	3:32
7.	"Ooh La La La^{c}"	Andrew Logan, Mike More, Paula Abdul	Andrew Logan, Mike More	4:12
8.	"Wishing On You"	Andrew Logan, Mike More, Orfeh	Andrew Logan, Mike More	3:34
9.	"Absolutely Maybe"	Brett "Dig" Laurence, Shelly Peiken	Andrew Logan, Mike More, Jeff Lorber (add.)	4:04
10.	"Sugardaddy^{d}"	Andrew Logan, Kenny Gamble, Leon Huff, Mike More	Andrew Logan, Mike More	3:22
11.	"Nobody^{e}"	Alexander Richbourg, Arthur Hoyle, LaKeisha Miles	Andrew Logan, Mike More, Alex Richbourg (co.)	3:43
12.	"Cherry Crush"	Andrew Logan, Mike More	Andrew Logan, Mike More	2:56
13.	"We Are Family (Angel's Style)"	Andrew Logan, Bernard Edwards, Mike More, Nile Rodgers	Andrew Logan, Mike More	3:21

== Singles ==
- "If You Wanna Dance"

US Single
1. "If You Wanna Dance" (Radio Edit) - 3:21
2. "If You Wanna Dance" (Thunderpuss 2000 Radio Mix) - 3:47
3. "Wishing On You" - 3:46

US Vinyl, 12", Promo
A "If You Wanna Dance" (Thunderpuss 2000 Club Mix) - 9:30
B "If You Wanna Dance" (Thunderdub) - 8:43

- "I Just Can't Help Myself" (Promo)

== Chart performance ==
Chart (2000)	Peak position
US Billboard 200	184

== Notes ==
- ^a Contains a sample from "Spirit of the Boogie" and an interpolation of "Get Down on It", both recorded by Kool & the Gang.
- ^b Contains a sample from "Paradise", recorded by Change.
- ^c Contains a sample from "Let's Go Dancin' (Ooh La La La)", recorded by Kool & the Gang.
- ^d Contains a sample from "Enjoy Yourself", recorded by The Jacksons.
- ^e Contains a sample from "Love You Inside Out", recorded by the Bee Gees.
