= Early childhood development =

Rapid physical, psychological and social growth

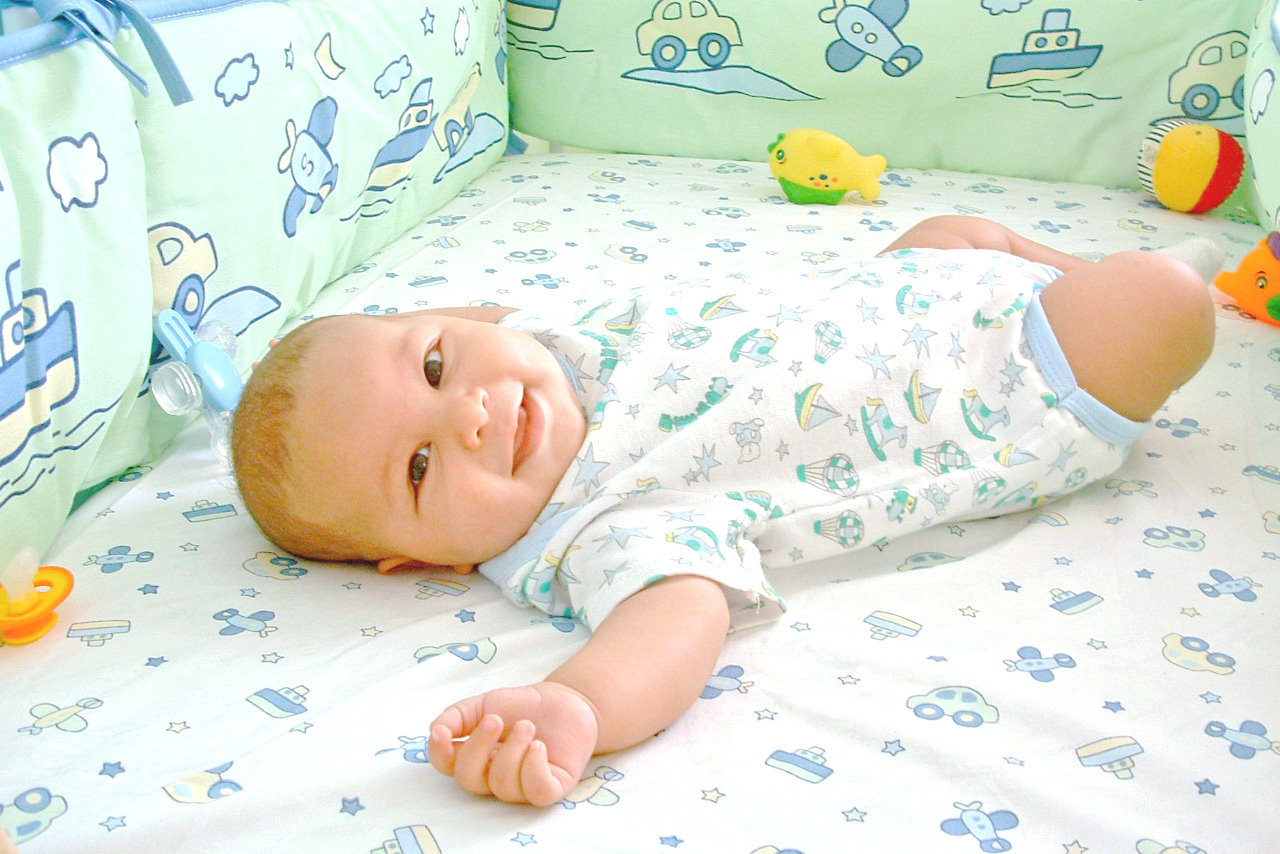

Early childhood development is the period of rapid physical, psychological and social growth and change that begins before birth and extends into early childhood. While early childhood is not well defined, one source asserts that the early years begin in utero and last until 3 years of age.

== Milestones ==
Developmental milestones represent useful markers that medical professionals and families can use to determine the developmental stage of a growing child. The following table contains examples of typical milestones achieved at each time point across all four domains:

Example Milestones of Development
	Gross Motor	Fine Motor	Social	Cognitive/Language
6 months	Rolls over	Brings objects to mouth	Stranger anxiety	Consonants while babbling
9 months	Sits with support	Pincer grasp	Separation anxiety	Understands "No"
12 months	Stands well	Bangs things together	Cries when familiars leave	Responds to simple commands
18 months	Walks alone	Scribbles with crayon	Hugs familiar people	Says several individual words
2 years	Stands on tip toes	Stacks 4+ blocks	Plays with other children	50% of words intelligible to a stranger
3 years	Runs easily	Turns pages in a book	Copies others	75% of words intelligible to a stranger

Length and weight clinical growth chart for a male child from birth to 36 months.

== Pediatric growth ==
Pediatric growth is measured in height or length, head circumference (used from 0–2 years of age), weight, and BMI (used starting at 2 years of age). It is determined by multiple factors including genetic, environmental, hormonal, nutritional and psychosocial factors. Some factors, such as maternal nutrition and alcohol, tobacco and drug exposure affect size at birth while other factors, such as genetic syndromes and family members heights have a later influence on size. In addition, different endocrine factors or hormones like growth hormone, insulin-like growth factors, thyroid hormones, glucocorticoids, and reproductive hormones contribute to normal growth.

=== Normal physical parameters and ranges ===
Percentile growth charts, such as the figures created by the Centers for Disease Control and Prevention (CDC) shown on this page, are used to track growth by comparing children of similar age and sex. The major percentile lines are the 95th, 90th, 75th, 50th, 25th, 10th, and 5th percentiles. The CDC growth reference charts define the normal range of growth as between the 5th and 95th percentiles.

While it is common for babies to shift percentiles during the first 2 years of life due to shifting from an intrauterine environment to one outside the uterus, shifting percentiles after 2 years of age may be the first sign of an underlying problem. Babies experience the greatest height velocity, or speed of growth, during the first 2 years of life. In addition, the mid parental height (MPH) is used to calculate the expected height potential and interpret the growth curve of a child. The following calculations are used for males and females respectively:

Male = (father's height + mother's height + 13 cm)/2

Female = (father's height-13 cm + mother's height)/2.

Head circumference and length clinical growth chart for a male child from birth to 36 months.

=== Abnormal/delayed development ===
Developmental delay occurs when children fail to develop milestones compared to their peers in the population. It is more of a descriptive term of a broad set of physical and psychosocial qualities than a diagnosis.

==== Growth delay ====
Children should be evaluated for abnormal linear growth when their charted growth crosses at least 2 percentiles beyond first 2 years of life, being born small for gestational age without signs of catching up to normal size, or abnormal height velocity for a child's age. In addition, if the child's height is more or less than 2 standard deviations (SD) below the average height for the child's age or 2 SD below the MPH, then they should be evaluated for short stature. The cause of short stature can be normal or pathological. Two normal causes of growth delay are familial or genetic short stature and constitutional growth delay. Familial short stature is when the child's estimated final height is appropriate based on their MPH with shorter parental heights in less than 10th percentile. Constitutional growth delay is when the child's delayed puberty causes a delay in growth which will eventually catch up after puberty begins. Measuring the bone age of the child after 3 years of age can be used to distinguish a normal from a pathological cause. Pathological causes in early childhood tend to be malnutrition and failure to thrive which could happen while they were developing in utero or after birth.

==== Development delay ====
Developmental delay is divided into Global Developmental Delay (GDD) and Intellectual Disability (ID). Global Developmental Delay is defined as a delay in two or more domains of development, while Intellectual Disability is defined as deficits in reasoning, adaptive functioning, or other intellectual aspects and typically becomes apparent later in life.

Both GDD and ID have a wide range of causes, and range from genetic mutations (Fragile X Disorder, Prader-Willi Disorder, etc.) to exposure to teratogens during gestation (Fetal Alcohol Syndrome). In many cases, the causes of GDD and ID in an individual can be the same.

== Physical development ==
Physical development refers to the development of movement, the brain and all other relevant stages of development that contributes to locomotion. In early childhood, children develop the ability to gradually control movement, achieve balance and coordination and fine and gross motor skills. Physical development milestones in early childhood include:

1. Growth and control of muscles, joints, limbs etc.
2. Fine and gross motor skills
3. Mastery of dynamic skills, locomotion, agility, physical literacy, manipulating tools and a range of other physical skills
4. Sensory development
5. Inhibition of primitive reflexes.

A child's health and ability to thrive and flourish are linked to physical development. Providing adequate physical play experiences, opportunities for physical activity and movement in early years can enhance physical development in children. Many health and behavioural issues including difficulties with toilet training and postural disorders are strongly linked to the children's lack of physical activity.

=== Early childhood education and physical development ===
Early childhood education and care (ECEC) play a crucial role in early childhood physical development. With the high rates of children attending early childhood education, the task of raising healthy and strong children is equally the responsibility of both parents and preschool institutions. The incidence and quality of physical activity education in early childhood education have a strong positive effect on the cognitive, social and physical development of young children. Early childhood is a stage of rapid growth, development and learning and each child makes progress at different speeds and rates. It is essential to integrate physical training designed in accordance with the anatomical characteristics and age-related characteristics of a child's development, to ensure the normal physical development of preschool children.

The importance of physical space in early childhood education and care is increasing rapidly due to the significant influence of physical space on numerous developmental outcomes including behavioural, cognitive and emotional.

== Cognitive development ==
Early childhood is the most intensive period of brain development in human life. Ensuing optimal cognitive development in the early childhood is crucial to the future academic and cognitive accomplishment of the child. Cognitive development refers to the growth and advancement of mental abilities, thinking processes, and problem-solving skills. Sensory skills and visual perception during early infancy facilitate young children to quickly learn, perceive, process, and understand information from their surroundings and experiences. Studies that examine the cognitive development of children stress the importance of brain development and the presence of a stimulating environment to develop cognitive skills. The rapid brain development in the first years of life is primarily responsible for the infants' ability to process visual information, tactile information, auditory and olfactory information and movement control and planning.

The social background, family context, early childhood education and care and physical activities are important factors that influence the cognitive development of young children.

== Language and communication development ==
Newborn babies communicate primarily through their cries, and their cries vary depending on their requirements such as hunger, pain or even boredom. By 2nd and 3rd month of their life, babies develop early consonant sounds like /k/ and /g/. The second half of the first year is the babbling phase where babies begin with repeated sounds like "babababa" or "mamamama". Infants vocalising more tend to develop stronger communication skills. Early communication skills vary from child to child. Numerous factors influence early language and communication development including the cultural context, lived experiences, and individual differences, general progressions of development.

Appropriate methods and favourable environments play a crucial role in early communication and language development. There are several methods to promote early language and communication development. Turn and Talk approach is a widespread method to promote language development in young children. Under this method, children are encouraged to talk with their peers about a topic to develop their language.

== Social and emotional development ==
Social competence is defined as a behaviour that leads to successful social functioning. Although children develop social competence from a very young age, the display of social competence and the process of becoming socially competent becomes at a later stage. Childcare settings that provide regular care arrangements by adults other than parent figures give a safe atmosphere to develop peer relationships under the watch of adults. The social interaction needs and interests of toddlers and young children can be similar such as playing games like run-chase, throwing balls and jumping off step. Children who have the opportunity to interact with individuals other than parent figures have more opportunities to experience social interactions. There is empirical evidence indicating that more time spent with peer groups makes children more socially skillful at friendships and interactions. Negative social interaction experiences lead to maladaptive behaviours. One maladaptive category of social behaviours is aggression or bullying and another type of maladaptive category of social behaviour is avoidance, withdrawal or passive acquiescence.

== Emotional development ==
Emotional development is a lifelong process, and these skills develop at an early age. In the early years, children develop basic emotions such as joy, fear, sadness, anger, interest and surprise. The relationship with the primary caregivers plays a crucial role in the emotional development of young children. They try to imitate the facial expression of primary caregivers shortly after birth and it is the first form of communication. Children gradually learn to regulate emotions with healthy interaction with parents and primary caregivers.
