= Michael Levin =

Michael Levin may refer to:

- Michael Levin (writer), American author and ghostwriter
- Michael Levin (philosopher) (born 1943), American philosopher at City College of New York
- Michael Levin (biologist) (born 1969), American biologist at Tufts University
- Michael Levin (soldier) (1984–2006), American soldier in the Israel Defense Forces
- Michael Levin Sesega, Samoan born rock musician
- Mike Levin (born 1978), American politician from California
- Mike Levin (paediatrician), British professor of paediatrics
- Michael Levine (physician), American physician, scientist and academic

== See also ==
- Michael Levine (disambiguation)
