= Nobody's Angel (disambiguation) =

Nobody's Angel was an American girl band of the late 1990s and early 2000s.

Nobody's Angel may also refer to:

- Nobody's Angel (Nobody's Angel album)
- Nobody's Angel (Crystal Gayle album)
- "Nobody's Angel" (song), by Crystal Gayle
- Nobody's Angel, a novel by Thomas McGuane
