= Michael Levine =

Michael Levine may refer to:

- Michael Levine (DEA) (born 1939), former senior United States law enforcement agent
- Michael E. Levine (1941–2017), US legal scholar and airline executive
- Mike Levine (musician) (born 1949), bassist of Triumph
- Mike Levine (newspaper writer) (1952–2007), American columnist and editor
- Mike Levine (sports executive), American sports agent and business executive, head of CAA Sports
- Michael Levine (biologist) (born c. 1952), Princeton scientist and co-discoverer of the Homeobox
- Michael Levine (set designer) (born 1961), Canadian set designer
- Michael A. Levine (born 1964), American composer
- Michael H. Levine, founding executive director of the Joan Ganz Cooney Center at Sesame Workshop
- Michael Levine (publicist), American writer and publicist and founder of Levine Communication Office, Inc.
- Michael Levine (physician), emeritus Professor of Pediatrics and Medicine (Medical Genetics) in the Perelman School of Medicine at the University of Pennsylvania

== See also ==
- Mike Levin, California Democratic politician
- Michael Levin (disambiguation)
