= Martin Barratt =

British paediatrician and professor

- 180px
- Born: 13 February 1936; London, England, UK
- Died: 17 January 2014 (aged 77)
- Education: Trinity Hall, Cambridge
- Known for: First paediatrician to establish a centre for specialist services for children with kidney diseases. Research into childhood Nephrotic syndrome and Hemolytic-uremic syndrome.
- Scientific career
- Fields: paediatric nephrology
- Workplaces: St Thomas' Hospital, Johns Hopkins School of Medicine, Great Ormond Street Hospital

Thomas Martin Barratt CBE FRCP (13 February 1936 – 17 January 2014) was a British paediatrician and professor of paediatric nephrology. Barratt was most notable for developing a specialist service for children with kidney diseases in Britain, bringing peritoneal dialysis, haemodialysis, and later renal transplantation to ever younger children. Barratt was an early advocate for multidisciplinary care and developed a model that was later taken up by many other specialist centres across the world. His research led to a new treatments for many types of childhood kidney diseases., and for research into childhood Nephrotic syndrome and Hemolytic-uremic syndrome.

== Life ==
Barratt's father owned and ran a law firm, and his mother was one of the first women to matriculate at Cambridge University. He was the third of three children. Barratt's early schooling took place at Clifton College and after winning a scholarship to Trinity Hall, Cambridge, he graduated with a First-class honours in Natural Sciences.

Throughout his life, Barratt suffered from facioscapulohumeral muscular dystrophy, a disease that causes progressive weakness, which forced him to retire early, eventually forcing him to use wheelchair for movement. In retirement he kept up to date with the latest developments in paediatric nephrology.

== Career ==
Barratt completed his clinical training at St Thomas' medical school. After a number of house positions, he was appointed as a registrar at the Institute of Child Health, at Great Ormond Street Hospital, working with Professor Barbara Clayton. Barratt then spent a year as a research fellow at Johns Hopkins School of Medicine, Baltimore, working within the Department pharmacology and experimental therapeutics, and researching fluid physiology with Mackenzie Walser. Upon returning to the UK in 1967, Barratt was appointed as a lecturer working on paediatric nephrology with Professor John Soothill at the institute. In 1971, Barratt was promoted to senior lecturer in the Institute of Child Health and consultant paediatric nephrologist at Great Ormond Street Hospital for Children and in 1978 promoted to professor of paediatric nephrology.

In 1966 Barratt married Gill Owen, a social worker who was later promoted to group analyst and psychotherapist.

== Contributions ==
=== Research ===
When Barratt started his clinical career, the specialism of paediatric nephrology in the UK, outwith certain areas, was primitive. Barratt held the first post that was specifically committed, both academically and professionally to the treatment of children with renal disease.

Barratt initially worked by himself, but was joined by Michael Dillon in 1975, and together they built a major world class paediatric nephrology services department at Great Ormond Street Hospital and conducted a research programme at the Institute of Child Health. Barratt was later joined by Richard Trompeter and Lesley Rees who continued the work of Barratt.

Barratt early in his career realized that collaboration was needed in developing an interdisciplinary care model for the treatment of children with renal diseases, eventually working closely with the paediatric urologists David Innes Williams and Philip G. Ransley and the paediatric imager, Isky Gordon.

Barratt had a broad research focus, conducting research into GFR measurement, urolithiasis, renal cystic disease, Diabetes mellitus, kidney disorders, renal function after cardiopulmonary bypass, genetic studies in inherited kidney disorders and the urological disorders in children. It was research into childhood Nephrotic syndrome and the Hemolytic-uremic syndrome that was his most notable work, particularly the biological roles played by atopy, membrane charge and Cytokine release. Barratt undertook a number of trials to determine the best treatments with patients with nephrotic symptoms. In 1970, Barratt conducted a trial with the immunologist John Soothill, using cyclophosphamide treatment for nephrotic syndrome. Barratt tested the drugs Azathioprine, Levamisole and cyclosporine A in subsequent trials, eventually working with paediatrician Michael Levin and others to study pathogenetic mechanisms involved in the syndrome, including e.g. Platelet-derived growth factor and prostacyclin inhibition. Levin who was Barratt's registrar at Great Ormond Street stated of Barratt, that:

Clinically, Martin had the most wonderful clarity of thought—making the most complex issues clear. He had an absolute belief that the job of a consultant was to offer patients the best of all available evidence.

Barratt was considered an outstanding teacher and lecturer.

== Association work ==
From 1972 to 1976, Barratt was secretary of the British Association for Paediatric Nephrology, and from 1994 to 1997 he was president of the association. Barratt worked with the European Society for Paediatric Nephrology and the International Pediatric Nephrology Association. After his retirement, in 1998, Barratt was co-president along with the paediatrician Sir Cyril Chantler of the 11th Congress of the International Pediatric Nephrology Association.

== Bibliography ==
The following papers were his most well known and cited:

- Smellie, Jean M.; Barratt, T. Martin; Chantler, Cyril; Gordon, Isky; Prescod, Nina P.; Ransley, Philip G.; Woolf, Adrian S. (2001). "Medical versus surgical treatment in children with severe bilateral vesicoureteric reflux and bilateral nephropathy: a randomised trial". The Lancet. 357 (9265): 1329–1333. doi:10.1016/S0140-6736(00)04520-7. ISSN 0140-6736. PMID 11343739.
- Levinsky, Roland J.; Barratt, T. Martin (1979). "IgA IMMUNE COMPLEXES IN HENOCH-SCHÃ–NLEIN PURPURA". The Lancet. 314 (8152): 1100–1103. doi:10.1016/S0140-6736(79)92505-4. ISSN 0140-6736. PMID 91839.
- Walters, Martin D. S.; Matthei, I. Ute; Kay, Richard; Dillon, Michael J.; Barratt, T. Martin (June 1989). "The polymorphonuclear leucocyte count in childhood haemolytic uraemic syndrome". Pediatric Nephrology. 3 (2): 130–134. doi:10.1007/BF00852893.
- Rossetti, S.; Burton, Sarah; Strmecki, Lana; Pond, Gregory R.; San Millán, Jośe L.; Zerres, Klaus; Barratt, T. Martin; Ozen, Seza; Torres, Vicente E.; Bergstralh, Erik J.; Winearls, Christopher G.; Harris, Peter C. (1 May 2002). "The Position of the Polycystic Kidney Disease 1 (PKD1) Gene Mutation Correlates with the Severity of Renal Disease". Journal of the American Society of Nephrology. 13 (5): 1230–1237. doi:10.1097/01.ASN.0000013300.11876.37. hdl:11655/14465. PMID 11961010.
- Roy, Sushmita; Dillon, Michael J.; Trompeter, Richard S.; Barratt, T. Martin (26 May 1997). "Autosomal recessive polycystic kidney disease: long-term outcome of neonatal survivors". Pediatric Nephrology. 11 (3): 302–306. doi:10.1007/s004670050281.
- Rossetti, Sandro; Kubly, Vickie J.; Consugar, Mark B.; Hopp, Katharina; Roy, Sushmita; Horsley, Sharon W.; Chauveau, Dominique; Rees, Lesley; Barratt, T. Martin; van't Hoff, William G.; Niaudet, W. Patrick; Torres, Vicente E.; Harris, Peter C. (April 2009). "Incompletely penetrant PKD1 alleles suggest a role for gene dosage in cyst initiation in polycystic kidney disease". Kidney International. 75 (8): 848–855. doi:10.1038/ki.2008.686. PMC 2813773. PMID 19165178.
- Fizpatrick, Margaret M.; Walters, Martin D.S.; Trompeter, Richard S.; Dillon, Michael J.; Barratt, T. Martin (April 1993). "Atypical (non-diarrhea-associated) hemolytic-uremic syndrome in childhood". The Journal of Pediatrics. 122 (4): 532–537. doi:10.1016/S0022-3476(05)83531-0. PMID 8463896.
- Forsyth, KevinD; Fitzpatrick, MargaretM; Simpson, AnnaC; Barratt, T.Martin; Levinsky, RolandJ (August 1989). "Neutrophil-Mediated Endothelial Injury in Haemolytic Uraemic Syndrome". The Lancet. 334 (8660): 411–414. doi:10.1016/S0140-6736(89)90591-6. PMID 2569599.
- Fitzpatrick, Margaret M.; Shah, Vanita; Trompeter, Richard S.; Dillon, Michael J.; Barratt, T. Martin (October 1992). "Interleukin-8 and polymorphoneutrophil leucocyte activation in hemolytic uremic syndrome of childhood". Kidney International. 42 (4): 951–956. doi:10.1038/ki.1992.372. PMID 1453586.
- Fitzpatrick, M M; Shah, V; Trompeter, R S; Dillon, M J; Barratt, T M (31 August 1991). "Long term renal outcome of childhood haemolytic uraemic syndrome". BMJ. 303 (6801): 489–492. doi:10.1136/bmj.303.6801.489. PMC 1670846. PMID 1912857.
- Brock, Penelope R.; Koliouskas, Dimitri E.; Barratt, T. Martin; Yeomans, Elizabeth; Pritchard, Jon (April 1991). "Partial reversibility of cisplatin nephrotoxicity in children". The Journal of Pediatrics. 118 (4): 531–534. doi:10.1016/S0022-3476(05)83372-4. PMID 2007926.
- Levinsky, Roland J.; Malleson, Peter N.; Barratt, T. Martin; Soothill, John F. (19 January 1978). "Circulating Immune Complexes in Steroid-Responsive Nephrotic Syndrome". New England Journal of Medicine. 298 (3): 126–129. doi:10.1056/NEJM197801192980303. PMID 619241.

Barratt collaborated in the following books.

- Urology in Childhood., D Innes Williams; T Martin Barratt; Herbert B Eckstein; Sheila M Kohlinsky; George H Newns; Paul E Polani; Jack D Singer. Berlin, Heidelberg:Springer Berlin Heidelberg, 1974
- Pediatric nephrology., T Martin Barratt. Baltimore, Md. : Lippincott Williams & Wilkins, 1999

== Awards and honours ==
In 1997 Barratt was appointed Commander of the Order of the British Empire (CBE) for services to children and awarded the prestigious James Spence Medal in 2002.
