= What Do You Want from Me =

What Do You Want From Me(?) may refer to:

- What Do You Want from Me (album), by Orfeh, 2008
- "What Do You Want from Me?" (Cascada song), 2008
- "What Do You Want from Me?" (Monaco song), 1997
- "What Do You Want from Me" (Pink Floyd song), 1994
- "What Do You Want from Me" (Forever the Sickest Kids song), 2009
- "What Do You Want from Me?", by Take That from Progress, 2010
- "Whataya Want from Me", a 2009 song by Adam Lambert
