= Psychosocial short stature =

- Other names: Psychosocial dwarfism, psychogenic or stress dwarfism
- Specialty: Endocrinology

Psychosocial short stature (PSS) is a growth disorder that is observed between the ages of 2 and 15, caused by extreme emotional deprivation or stress.

The symptoms include decreased growth hormone (GH) and somatomedin secretion, very short stature, weight that is inappropriate for the height, and immature skeletal age. This disease is a progressive one, and as long as the child is left in the stressing environment, their cognitive abilities continue to degenerate. Though rare in the population at large, it is common in feral children and in children kept in abusive, confined conditions for extended lengths of time. It can cause the body to completely stop growing but is generally considered to be temporary; regular growth will resume when the source of stress is removed.

== Cause ==
Children with PSS have extremely low levels of growth hormone. These children possibly have a problem with growth hormone inhibiting hormone (GHIH) or growth hormone releasing hormone (GHRH). The children could either be unresponsive to GHRH, or too sensitive to GHIH.

Children who have PSS exhibit signs of failure to thrive. Even though they appear to be receiving adequate nutrition, they do not grow and develop normally compared to other children of their age.

An environment of constant and extreme stress causes PSS. Stress-released hormones in the body such as epinephrine and norepinephrine engage what is known as the fight-or-flight response. The heart speeds up, and the body diverts resources away from processes that are not immediately important; in PSS, the production of growth hormone (GH) is thus affected. As well as lacking growth hormone, children with PSS exhibit gastrointestinal problems due to the large amounts of epinephrine and norepinephrine, resulting in their bodies lacking proper digestion of nutrients and further affecting development.

While the cure for PSS is questionable, some studies show that placing the child affected with the disease in a foster or group home increases growth rate and socialization skills.

== Society and culture ==
One case was a child who was admitted to a hospital with an extremely low weight. One nurse took over his care, and he began to rapidly gain weight and his growth hormone levels increased during this time. The child was so dependent on the nurse emotionally that when she left, his levels returned to what they had been when he was admitted to the hospital, and once she returned, they stabilized once more.

When a police raid in 1987 released the children held by an Australian group known as The Family, one twelve-year-old girl weighed under 20 kg (44 lbs) and was under 120 cm (4 ft) tall. She grew 11 cm (4 in) in the following year, and her growth hormone levels returned to normal.

=== Fictional characters ===
In Günter Grass's 1959 novel The Tin Drum (Die Blechtrommel), the character Oskar Matzerath "willfully stunted his growth at three feet tall as a three-year-old, although later in the novel he grows to four feet one inch" in reaction to the stress he experiences—the petit-bourgeois German society.

In the novel Les Misérables by Victor Hugo, eight-year old Cosette had been abused, neglected and enslaved by the Thènardier family. The extreme abuse and neglect she faces is described as very stressful for her, and as a result she is described as simultaneously being as short as a child half her age and having an expression more appropriate for an older woman. She recovers after she is adopted by Jean Valjean and is of average height as an adult.

In One Flew Over the Cuckoo's Nest, Chief Bromden claims that one of Nurse Ratched's orderlies, Williams, a black man with dwarfism, gained his short stature from seeing white men rape his mother.

In the novel Flowers in the Attic by V. C. Andrews, twins Cory and Carrie Dollanganger are locked in an attic (with their two older siblings). The stress of their grandmother's abuse and lack of attention from their mother—along with arsenic poisoning and lack of outdoor play opportunities—stunts the twins' growth. Later in the series, Carrie is described as being eight years old, yet her physical appearance is that of a three-year-old.
