= MAGIC Foundation =

U.S. nonprofit organization

- Formation: 1989
- Type: Nonprofit organization
- Headquarters: Oak Park, Illinois, United States
- Chairman: Rich Buckley
- Revenue: $911,170 (2015)
- Expenses: $990,393 (2015)
- Website: www.magicfoundation.org

The MAGIC Foundation (short for Major Aspects of Growth in Children) is an American non-profit organization which helps families of children diagnosed with a wide variety of different growth impacting medical conditions through education, networking, physician referrals and numerous other services. It was founded in 1989. It is maintained through a network of volunteers and a full-time staff of five people. Their services include public education and awareness, quarterly newsletters, national networking, an annual convention, disorder specific brochures, and a Kids Program.

The foundation has a membership network in excess of 25,000 families. The disorders MAGIC families have are grouped into primary categories. They include: congenital adrenal hyperplasia, precocious puberty, growth hormone deficiency (both adults and children), panhypopituitarism, McCune–Albright syndrome, Turner syndrome, Russell–Silver syndrome, thyroid disorders (both congenital and acquired), optic nerve hypoplasia, and other rare disorders.

== Educational programs ==
MAGIC offers a national educational program every year for the families of affected children and another for affected adults. Physicians specialising in these disorders, from all over the world, volunteer to speak to and assist the children and affected adults. They also offer a weekly email with links to recently published medical information to parents of children impacted by Small for Gestational Age babies, Congenital Adrenal Hyperplasia, McCune-Albright Syndrome, Russell–Silver Syndrome (also known as Silver–Russell Syndrome), Optic Nerve Hypoplasia, Septo Optic Dysplasia, Hypophosphatasia, and others.

== Controversy ==
The MAGIC Foundation received significant funding from Genentech and Eli Lilly. It was thought that the money was to undertake case finding of children with short stature who might benefit from their human growth hormone treatments. The US Food and Drug Administration investigated Genentech in 1992 and 1994 for using numerous charities to improperly advertise this medication. None of the monies donated to either the Human Growth Foundation nor The MAGIC foundation were donated with any stipulations as to how the money was to be utilized. The donations were support funds for the patients affected.

== See also ==
- Constitutional growth delay
