= National Organization of Short Statured Adults =

American non-profit advocacy group for adults of short stature

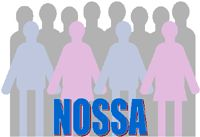
- Formation: 2005
- Dissolved: 2013
- Type: 501(c)(4) nonprofit
- Purpose: Activism and education
- Location: New York City, United States

The National Organization of Short Statured Adults (NOSSA) was an American non-profit advocacy group for adults of short stature. The organization clearly defined "short stature" to be men 5 ft 7 in (1.70 m) or below and women 5 ft 2 in (1.57 m) or below in height. The group advocated on behalf of short people and hoped to foster greater acceptance of short people within society. NOSSA was opposed to the prejudice known as heightism. The group defined heightism as, "a prejudiced attitude about human height that often results in discrimination. It is based on the belief that short stature is an inferior trait and therefore undesirable." The organization ran a series of public education programs, sponsored height-related research, acted as a media watchdog group, provided legal assistance for those affected by heightism, hosted online discussion groups, and invited members to gather once a year for an annual convention. NOSSA dissolved in May 2013 because of a lack of support.

== History ==
NOSSA was formed in New York City in 2005. The organization was run by a four-person board of directors (trustees) who were elected to serve four-year terms in office. In May 2006, the group's secretary made comments in support of a Nebraska judge's decision against imprisoning a short man over child sexual abuse charges, because his stature might have affected his safety in prison. The organization apologized for the comments and removed the trustee who had made them, as well as making a donation to the Nebraska Children and Families Foundation. Short Support editor Steven Goldsmith became the new secretary. In July 2006, NOSSA began producing a podcast, Standing Tall Against Discrimination. In May 2008, NOSSA was featured in the Canadian Documentary S&M: Short and Male.

== HGH controversy ==
In 2003, the Food and Drug Administration (FDA) approved the use of human growth hormone (HGH) for children well below the average height with no medically determined cause, also known as idiopathic short stature. GH therapy had been prescribed previously for only medically determined causes of reduced height. Most patients to which this therapy was now made available produce normal levels of growth hormone on their own. Some other biological causes still place these children more than two standard deviations below average height.

NOSSA announced its opposition to the use of human growth hormone for short, but otherwise healthy, children. The organization believed that living short was not a problem; the real difficulties lies in the social bias against short people. In part to define the organization's position on the matter, NOSSA representative and author Ellen Frankel LCSW stated, "What we need is education for those who discriminate against short people, not the genetic engineering of the victims of that prejudice." Frankel states, "The growth hormone deficient child suffers from an underlying medical problem that affects the body's health in different ways. The non-growth-hormone-deficient child has no underlying medical problem. They simply present as a variation on the norm with regard to height. The decision to medically intervene on the healthy child's stature is socially based due to height discrimination and prejudice."

== Cosmetic leg lengthening ==
Leg lengthening is a complex process that has traditionally been performed primarily on children to correct disproportional leg lengths. It has also been an option for people with dwarfism to gain height. More recently, the procedure has been used to give people with constitutional short stature two or three extra inches of height. (Constitutional short stature refers to people who are in the bottom fifth percentile of height in their region and do not display any deformities common with dwarfism.)

NOSSA claimed to receive hundreds of e-mails each year from people requesting more information on cosmetic leg lengthening. The group actively discouraged short statured people from undergoing leg lengthening solely for cosmetic reasons. The group encouraged anyone who was seriously considering the surgery to research the procedure and surgeon thoroughly before undergoing the procedure. NOSSA encouraged people to accept and love themselves as they were.

== Princeton economist study ==
In August 2006, a study by Princeton University economists Anne Case and Christina Paxson, "Stature and Status: Height, Ability, and Labor Market Outcomes", concluded that tall people are smarter than their height-challenged peers. The researchers report, "On average, taller people earn more because they are smarter. As early as age 3 — before schooling has had a chance to play a role — and throughout childhood, taller children perform significantly better on cognitive tests. The correlation between height in childhood and adulthood is approximately 0.7 for both men and women, so that tall children are much more likely to become tall adults. As adults, taller individuals are more likely to select into higher paying occupations that require more advanced verbal and numerical skills and greater intelligence, for which they earn handsome returns." Case and Paxson emphasized that the correlation between height and intelligence was due to non-genetic factors, such as health and nutrition in utero and in childhood. As they explained, "Our results say nothing about the relationship between cognitive ability and that part of height that is determined by genetic background. Our results speak to that part of height that is driven by health and nutrition. There are very many very smart short people (Einstein comes to mind) and, frankly, many not-so-smart tall people."

NOSSA Secretary Steven Goldsmith responded to the study by stating, "If a similar study made similar conclusions about any other minority group, there would be fierce outrage from those groups and sympathy from many who are not in those groups." NOSSA Advisor Ellen Frankel LCSW continued, "We understand racism. It's time we take a serious look at heightism."

In reporting on the study, the media simplified the connection that the economists had drawn between height and intelligence. Paxson and Case theorized that a person genetically programmed to be 6'4" who reaches only 6'2" because of poor nutrition is not necessarily smarter than someone who with optimal nutrition has reached his full height potential of 5'4".

== eHarmony boycott ==
On April 2, 2007, NOSSA called for a boycott of the online dating website eHarmony. According to its press release:

Suspicions have been confirmed after numerous tests indicated that the exact same responses to the website’s membership questionnaire, with the exception of physical height, resulted in either approval of membership (when an acceptable tall height was submitted) or denial of membership (when a short height was submitted). These tests were conducted numerous times to ensure accuracy. The National Organization Of Short Statured Adults has requested a full explanation from the company. On June 1, 2007, NOSSA received a response from eHarmony in which the company denied that it had ever discriminated against short statured people.

== Legal programs ==
NOSSA provided legal assistance for members who present valid claims of height discrimination in employment, real estate, public accommodations, public service, and educational facilities.

Currently, Michigan is the only state of the United States that prohibits height discrimination. Three American cities currently prohibit height discrimination: Santa Cruz, California; San Francisco, California; and New York City, which prohibits it in employment, housing, and public accommodations. The District of Columbia prohibits discrimination based on personal appearance. Ontario, Canada, prohibits height discrimination under the human rights code.

Although NOSSA was not directly involved in any lobbying activities, the group supported height discrimination legislation. NOSSA also provided legal assistance to members who present valid claims of fraud perpetuated by various growth-product manufacturers.

== Children and young adult programs ==
Bullying involves the consistent tormenting of others through verbal harassment, physical assault, or other more subtle methods of coercion such as manipulation. Smaller children and young adults are often perceived as being physically weaker and vulnerable. Because of this, short children are frequently targeted by bullies. NOSSA provided support services for short-statured children and their families who were experiencing a bullying problem. NOSSA also offered a $500 college scholarship award each year to one voting member who was in "good standing" and could demonstrate that they were a student by mailing proof of college enrollment as well as an essay on heightism.

== Dissolution ==
On January 15, 2013, NOSSA announced on its blog that the organization would be ceasing operations because of a lack of support. On May 17, 2013, the organization ceased operations.
