= CGD =

CGD may refer to:

Organizations

- Caixa Geral de Depósitos, Portuguese bank
- Compagnia Generale del Disco, Italian record label
- Center for Global Development, a Washington-based think-tank

Other

- IATA code for Changde Taohuayuan Airport, China
- Chronic granulomatous disease, a condition of the immune system
- Constitutional growth delay, a condition inhibiting children's growth
- Certified GeoExchange Designer -- see IGSHPA and Association of Energy Engineers
- Commercial Grade Dedication
- NetBSD Cryptographic Device Driver
