= What Do You Want from Me (album) =

What Do You Want From Me

Studio album by Orfeh
- Released: September 30, 2008
- Genre: Pop rock, R&B, Funk, power pop
- Length: 44:54
- Label: Sh-K-Boom Records
- Producer: Andrew Logan, Pam Reswick

What Do You Want From Me is the debut solo album by Orfeh, released on September 30, 2008 (see 2008 in music)

== Track listing ==
1. "What Do You Want From Me" (Orfeh, Andrew Logan, Pam Reswick) – 4:21
2. "Look At Me Now" (Andrew Logan, Pam Reswick) – 4:05
3. "Last Time I Cry" (Andrew Logan, Mike More) – 4:01
4. "Love Me Today" (Andrew Logan, Orfeh, Gary Wright) – 2:38
5. "Dirt" (Andrew Logan, Pam Reswick) – 3:24
6. "Tell That To My Heart" (Duet with Andrew Logan) (Andrew Logan, Pam Reswick) – 3:42
7. "Falling in Love" (Toby Gad, Orfeh) - 3:30
8. "Sing You To Sleep" (Andrew Logan, Mike More) – 3:52
9. "Don't Wanna Do Wrong" (Andrew Logan, Mike More) – 3:52
10. "Fall" (Andrew Logan, Pam Reswick) – 4:31
11. "Just Don't Talk About Love" (Andrew Logan, Pam Reswick) – 3:38
12. "Up Tempo Pop Song" (Andrew Logan, Pam Reswick, Orfeh) – 3:05
