= Times Herald-Record =

Daily newspaper published in Middletown, NY, USA

- The October 3, 2005 front page of the Times Herald-Record in its former tabloid format
- Type: Daily newspaper
- Format: Broadsheet
- Owner: USA Today Co.
- Publisher: Joe Vanderhoof
- Founded: July 30, 1956 (as Middletown Daily Record)
- Language: English
- Headquarters: Wallkill, New York, United States
- Circulation: 20,409 (as of 2018)
- Website: recordonline.com

The Times Herald-Record, often referred to as The Record or Middletown Record in its coverage area, is an American daily newspaper published in Middletown, New York, covering the northwest suburbs of New York City. It covers Orange, Sullivan and Ulster counties in New York. It was published in a tabloid format until March 1, 2022, when it began being published like most other newspapers, in a broadsheet format.

The newspaper left its long-time main office in Middletown in 2021 and moved into a small office nearby in the Town of Wallkill. The newsroom had 120 full-time equivalent employees in the 1990s, but as of July 2023 it had one news reporter and one sports reporter.

It came into being in the late 1950s when Middletown's two papers merged. It is owned by USA Today Co.

== History ==
A newspaper has been in existence in some form in the city of Middletown since 1851. The Times Herald was the result of a 1927 merger of the Times-Press, a merger of the old Middletown (Whig) Press of the 1850s and the Daily Times, founded in 1891, and the Daily Herald, founded in 1918, but also going back to the 1850s. The Times Herald had the Middletown market to itself from 1927 until 1956, when Jacob M. Kaplan started publishing the Middletown Daily Record, the first daily U.S. newspaper to use cold type, from a garage on North Street. The new paper grew to a daily circulation of 19,000 within three years but lost a lot of money in the process.

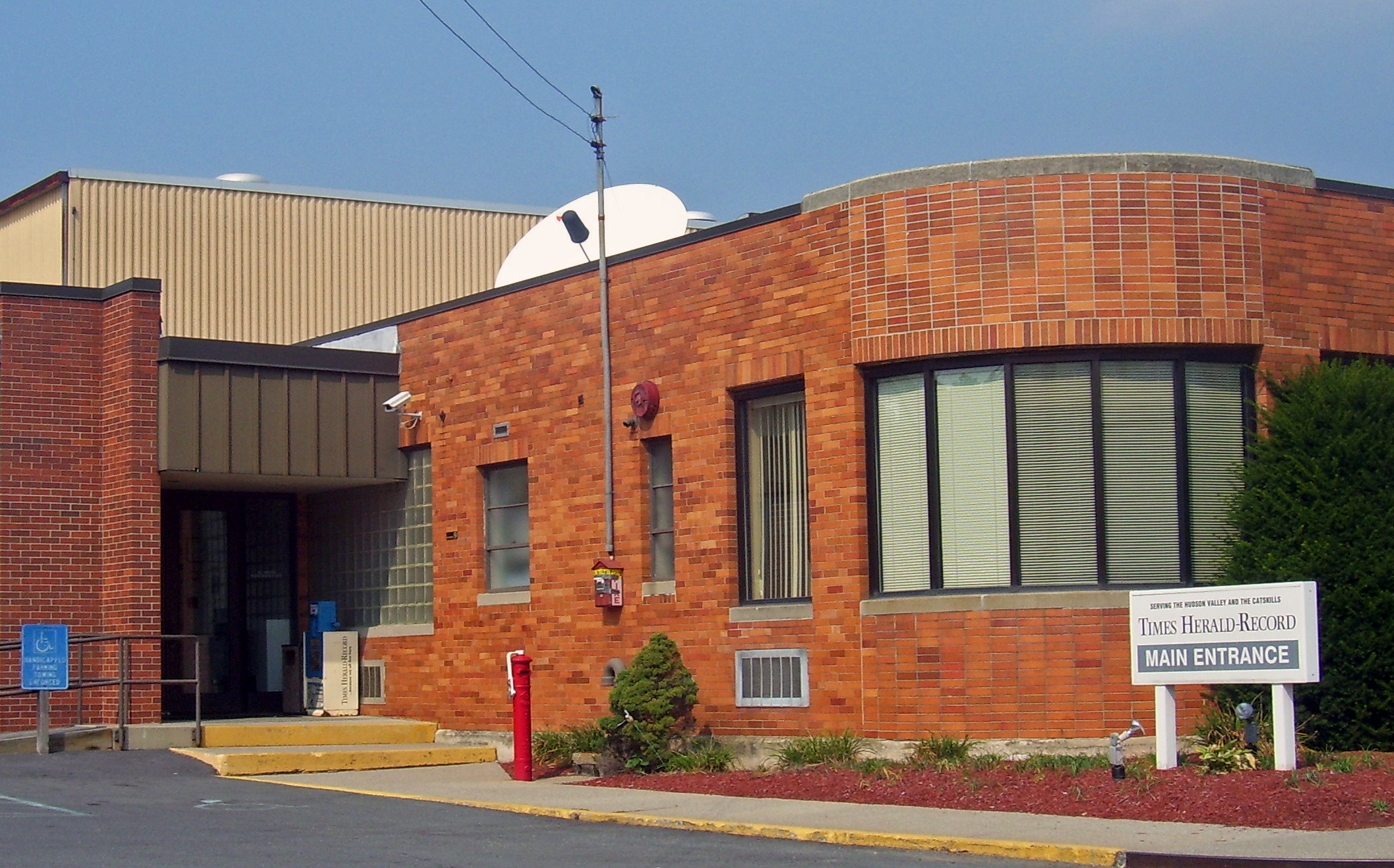
Times Herald-Record′s former main offices in Middletown

In November 1959, James H. Ottaway Sr., the founder of Ottaway Newspapers Inc., bought the Times-Herald and the Port Jervis Union-Gazette from Ralph Ingersoll, who had owned the papers since 1951. The Gazette, serving Port Jervis and surrounding communities, still exists as a weekly newspaper published by the Times Herald-Record. A few months later, in April 1960, Kaplan sold his Daily Record to Ottaway. Ottaway tried to convert the paper to a broadsheet, but restored the original format after three months. In October 1960 the two papers were merged into their current form. The Sunday Record began in 1969, shortly after Ottaway itself was acquired by Dow Jones & Company. The newspaper covered the Woodstock Festival in 1969. It can be seen in both the 1970 documentary and 2009's Taking Woodstock.

The Record was often an innovator in newspaper publishing and was one of the first to print color. The newspaper underwent a significant redesign and page cut-down in 2007. At that time, The Sunday Record was given the standard Times Herald-Record nameplate. In 2008, the newspaper's Web site, recordonline.com, underwent a complementary redesign. The in-print and online redesigns were launched to coincide with bolstered local and business news coverage.

In 2007, when News Corp bought Dow Jones, the newspaper again changed hands. At the time, the Times-Herald Record was the largest paper owned by Dow Jones and Ottaway.

On September 4, 2013, News Corp announced that it would sell the Dow Jones Local Media Group to Newcastle Investment Corp.—an affiliate of Fortress Investment Group—for $87 million. The newspapers were to be operated by GateHouse Media, a newspaper group owned by Fortress. News Corp CEO and former Wall Street Journal editor Robert James Thomson indicated that the newspapers were "not strategically consistent with the emerging portfolio" of the company. GateHouse in turn filed prepackaged Chapter 11 bankruptcy on September 27, 2013, to restructure its debt obligations in order to accommodate the acquisition. GateHouse was subsequently purchased by New Media Investment Group in 2019 and merged into Gannett, making Gannett the largest newspaper chain in the United States with over 100 dailies.

In February 2020, the paper announced it would be closing its printing plant in Wallkill, New York and outsourcing its printing to a plant in Rockaway, New Jersey in order to "adapt to market-driven changes and competition." Ninety-four employees were laid off in the process. In July 2021, employees of the Times Herald-Record, Poughkeepsie Journal and The Journal News voted to unionize. They joined the NewsGuild-CWA and formed the Hudson Valley News Guild. In January 2022, the newspaper announced it would no longer publish a print edition of the newspaper on Saturdays beginning in March and would instead publish a digital version only.

In February 2024, the newspaper announced it would switch from carrier to postal delivery.

== Prominent employees ==
- Avrom "Al" Romm (1926–1999) was named city editor of the Daily Record in 1957 and became the Times Herald-Record's first managing editor after the merger in 1960, a position he held until he was named editorial page editor in 1976. His youngest son is climate expert Joseph J. Romm.
- Malcolm Browne, who later won the Pulitzer Prize covering the Vietnam War for the Associated Press.
- Manny Fuchs (1924–2005) joined the Daily Record in 1957 and became chief photographer in 1960. He was a concentration camp survivor who became a photojournalist. Before and during his stint at the Record, he photographed Picasso, Marilyn Monroe, Tennessee Williams, and Ben Hecht, among others. In 1966, he went to Vietnam to take pictures of hometown soldiers in the war zone. In addition to his photojournalism assignments, he was a patient teacher but hard taskmaster.
- Glenn Doty, one of the paper's former managing editors, later trained hundreds of student journalists at The Legislative Gazette, a student-run newspaper covering state government in Albany operated jointly by SUNY campuses at New Paltz and Albany.
- Hunter S. Thompson, the future creator of gonzo journalism, was fired by Editor Al Romm after "kicking open the office candy machine with his bare feet - again."
- Mike Levine (1952–2007) began as a columnist in 1983, working his way up to executive editor in 1999. After a year's hiatus in 2001, he became executive editor in 2002. The Mike Levine Journalism Education Fund was founded after his death, and sponsors an annual training for aspiring writers at The Mike Levine Workshop. The workshop is led each year by prominent writers. In addition, an annual Mike Levine Column Read-a-Thon is held which raises money for the Education Fund. Levine is the first writer in the history of The Record for whom every article he had written is available online by archive A clip of Levine addressing his community is on YouTube.
- Mark Pittman (1957–2009) was Metro-Editor until 1997 when he left to work for Bloomberg News. He reported on the 2008 financial crisis.
- Mike Vaccaro was a sports editor before joining the New York Post in 2002.
