= S&M: Short and Male =

- Directed by: Howard Goldberg
- Produced by: Ina Fichman
- Starring: Tom Rubin; Stuart and Stephen Seltzer; Matthew Campisi; Joe Mangano; Akash Shukla; Jiang Tao
- Cinematography: German Gutierrez
- Music by: Ned Bouhalassa
- Distributed by: Instinct Films
- Release date: May 16, 2008
- Country: Canada
- Language: English

S&M: Short and Male is a 2008 Canadian documentary directed by Howard Goldberg which examines the obstacles that short-statured men face every day in life, love and work. It discussed the psychology, social pressure and discrimination lawsuits around this topic. The film was featured at the 2008 Hot Docs film festival and premiered on CTV in May 2008.

== See also ==
- Height discrimination
