= Mike More =

American musician, songwriter and record producer

- Born: Michael David Munves; January 5, 1966 (age 59); New York, United States
- Other names: Amadayus Billionaire
- Spouse: Bani Azari (m. 2008)
- Awards: Musician, songwriter, record producer
- Website: http://www.nabbr.com/

Mike More (born Michael David Munves; January 5, 1966, New York) is an American musician, songwriter, and record producer.

== Early life ==
More's mother died in a car accident when he was young. He attended the High School of the Performing Arts for music (Class of 1984), and met his musical partner, Orfeh, there. Their first recording endeavor was with CBS Records as the group Genevha (sic). They released a two song vinyl, Life in the Movies, in 1987. His credits on the album were under the pseudonym of Amadayus Billionaire. After that project, they formed Or-n-More, and signed with EMI Records, where they experienced mild success. Their self-titled debut album went gold, and the single, "Everyotherday", became a hit stateside and abroad. However, after a hierarchy change at EMI, they were dropped from the label.

== Career ==
After his short-lived recording career ended, More continued to write and produce music for other artists. Some of the artists he has written and produced music for include:

- Nobody's Angel (with Andrew Logan)
- Dakota Moon (with Andrew Logan)
- Freedom Williams
- Don Henley
- Britney Spears
- Garth Brooks

Most recently, he founded the web-based media distribution company, Nabbr. He also founded his own music production and publishing company Mike More Media. He is also a voting member of the Producers & Engineers wing of NARAS.

== Personal life ==
He married Bani Azari on September 12, 2008.
