= Cervical vertebral maturation method =

Medical examination method

Cervical vertebral maturation method is an assessment of skeletal age based on the cervical vertebrae, as seen in a cephalometric radiograph. also called as CVM. It was developed by Lamparski in 1972. Cephalometric radiographs are usually obtained for orthodontic patients, which offer the benefit of avoiding additional radiation exposure when gauging the adolescent growth spurt. Nevertheless, several studies have contested the reliability and accuracy of deriving skeletal age from cervical vertebrae, with one study contending that chronologic age is just as reliable as CVM method. Research into CVM has yielded notable findings in regards to intraobserver and interobserver reliability. Comparable results to that of hand–wrist radiographs have been recorded, which was further affirmed by the outcome of one specific prospective review of the literature.

== History ==
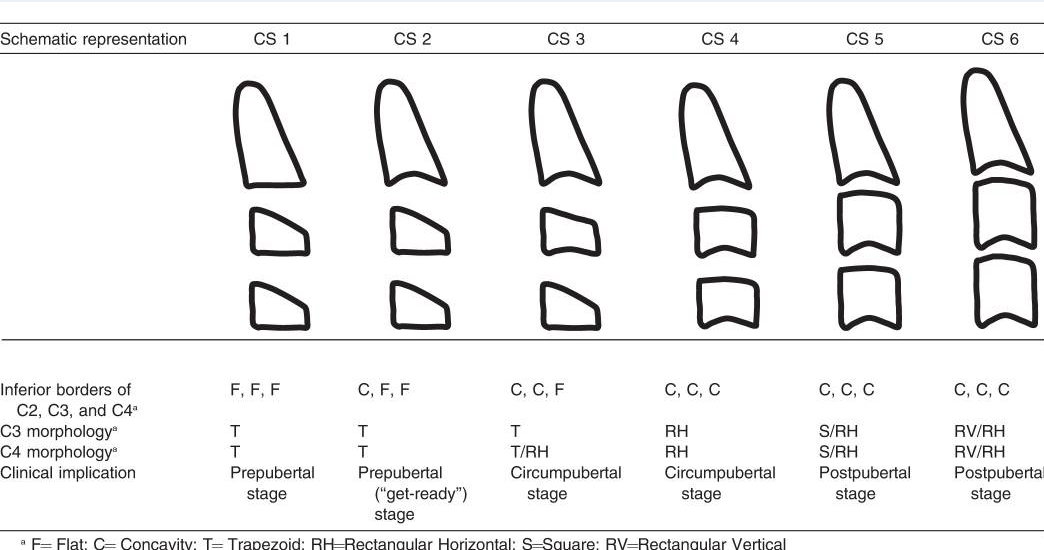
Cervical vertebral maturation method

Estimating the bone age of a living child is typically performed by comparing images of their bones to images of models of the average skeleton for a given age and sex acquired from healthy children and compiled in an atlas. Features of bone development assessed in determining bone age include the presence of bones (have certain bones ossified yet), the size and shape of bones, the amount of mineralization (also called ossification), and the degree of fusion between the epiphyses and metaphyses. The first atlas published in 1898 by John Poland consisted of x-ray images of the left hand and wrist. Since then, updated atlases of the left hand and wrist have appeared, along with atlases of the foot and ankle, knee, and elbow. An alternative approach to the atlas method just described is the so-called "single-bone method" where maturity scales are assigned to individual bones. Here, a selection of bones are given a score based on their perceived development, a sum is totaled based on the individual bone scores, and the sum is correlated to a final bone age.

Lamparski (1972) used the cervical vertebrae and found them to be as reliable and valid as the hand-wrist area for assessing skeletal age. He developed a series of standards for the assessment of skeletal age for both males and females. This method has the advantage of eliminating the need for additional radiographic exposure in cases where the vertebrae have already been recorded on a lateral cephalometric radiographic.

Hassel & Farman (1995) developed an index based on the second, third, and fourth cervical vertebrae (C2, C3, C4) and proved that atlas maturation was highly correlated with skeletal maturation of the hand-wrist. Several smartphone applications have been developed to facilitate the use of vertebral methods such as Easy Age.
