= Michael Levine (physician) =

American physician and professor

Michael A. Levine
- Citizenship: American
- Occupations: Physician, scientist, academic, and author
- Awards: Frederic C. Bartter Award, American Society for Bone and Mineral Research (2018); Lifetime Achievement Award, Human Growth Foundation (2021); Judson J. Van Wyk Prize, Pediatric Endocrine Society (2022)

Academic background
- Education: A.B. M.D. M.L.
- Alma mater: Rutgers College; Drexel University College of Medicine; University of Pennsylvania Carey Law School

Academic work
- Institutions: University of Pennsylvania

Michael A. Levine is an American physician, scientist, academic, and author. He is an emeritus professor of Pediatrics and Medicine (Medical Genetics) in the Perelman School of Medicine at the University of Pennsylvania.

Levine's research has focused on identifying the molecular mechanisms underlying inherited disorders of mineral metabolism and the embryological development of the parathyroid glands. His authored works include publications in academic journals, including Journal of Bone and Mineral Research, Proceedings of the National Academy of Sciences, The New England Journal of Medicine, and the Journal of Biological Chemistry as well as a multi-edition book titled The Parathyroids: Basic and Clinical Concepts. He also received a Lifetime Achievement Award from the Human Growth Foundation, and was also awarded the European Society for Pediatric Endocrinology (ESPE) International Award. He is an elected member of the Association of American Physicians and the American Society for Clinical Investigation.

== Education ==
Levine completed his A.B. from Rutgers College in 1972 and his M.D. from Drexel University College of Medicine in 1976. He completed his clinical training in Internal Medicine at The Johns Hopkins University School of Medicine and took dual fellowship training in Endocrinology and Genetics at the National Institutes of Health. He later earned a Master in Law from the University of Pennsylvania Carey Law School in 2024.

== Career ==
Levine started his career as an assistant professor of medicine at Johns Hopkins University in Baltimore from 1982 to 1986. Afterward, he was promoted to associate professor of medicine at the same institution from 1986 to 1992. He also served as an associate professor of pathology and physiology at the same university from 1989 to 1992. Later on, he was appointed as a professor of medicine, pathology, and physiology from 1992 to 2003. He was appointed as the Lawson Wilkins Professor of Pediatrics at Johns Hopkins University in 1998, a position he held until 2003. In 2008, he became a professor of Pediatrics and Medicine (Medical Genetics) at the University of Pennsylvania, and in 2019, he became emeritus.

Levine was the Physician-in-Chief at Cleveland Clinic Children's Hospital in 2003. In 2008, he was appointed Chief of the Division of Endocrinology and Diabetes at the Children's Hospital of Philadelphia, a role he held until 2018. In the same year, he was also appointed the Lester Baker Chair in Endocrinology and Diabetes. Within the past few years, Dr. Levine has sat on the Pediatric Endocrine Society's Board of Directors, as well.

== Research ==
Levine's research interests focus on the genetic basis of endocrine disease, particularly disorders that impact bone and mineral metabolism. His primary clinical interests are endocrine diseases that affect bone and mineral metabolism, particularly rickets and osteomalacia, osteoporosis, primary hyperparathyroidism, and hypoparathyroidism. His approach has been to apply molecular and genetic tools to analyze the basis of altered hormone action, particularly in G protein-coupled signal transduction systems that affect growth and development. He has identified the molecular basis of inherited disorders of mineral metabolism, including familial hypoparathyroidism, pseudohypoparathyroidism, and the McCune Albright syndrome. Later in his career, his research interests extended to the molecular basis for embryological development of the parathyroid glands and genetic modifiers of vitamin D action.

In his early work, Levine focused on pseudohypoparathyroidism and Albright's hereditary osteodystrophy (AHO), an autosomal dominant disorder characterized by physical traits such as short stature, brachydactyly, and subcutaneous ossifications. His work led to the discovery that pseudohypoparathyroidism type 1A is caused by defects in the maternal allele of the imprinted GNAS gene that lead to reduced expression or function of Gsα protein. Moreover, he also worked on identifying a gain-of-function mutation in the GNAS gene as the basis for constitutive activation of adenylyl cyclase in the McCune-Albright syndrome and confirmed that the unusual distribution of the endocrine, cutaneous, and skeletal lesions in the syndrome is the result of a postzygotic mosaicism.

Levine has identified the bases for rare disorders of vitamin D metabolism that lead to rickets. He has described the role of genetic variants in CYP2R1, the gene that encodes the principal hepatic 25-hydroxylase, as a cause of reduced serum concentrations of 25-hydroxyvitamin D and rickets. Moreover, he identified gain-of-function variants in CYP3A4, which encodes an enzyme that can inactivate many steroid hormones and drugs, as the basis for an unusual form of vitamin D dependent rickets.

Levine and his associates showed that pathogenic variants in the ABCC6 gene, the cause of pseudoxanthoma elasticum, are also the basis for type 2 form of Generalized Arterial Calcification of Infancy (GACI). He has also been involved in studies to develop innovative treatments for infants with this disorder.

=== Patents ===
Levine has developed isolated polynucleotides and proteins related to oncogenic osteomalacia, along with methods to modulate bone mineralization and phosphate metabolism, paving the way for potential therapies for related diseases. He also worked on the phosphatonin-related gene, developing innovative methods for modulating phosphate homeostasis and renal phosphate transport through the FRP-4 gene and protein, which offer potential treatments for oncogenic osteomalacia and related diseases.

== Awards and honors ==
- 1986 – Young Investigator Award, American Society for Bone and Mineral Research
- 1990 – The Fuller Albright Award, American Society for Bone and Mineral Research
- 2000 – Research Award, The Progressive Osseous Heteroplasia Association
- 2012 – Research Award, Hypoparathyroidism Association of America
- 2015 – Distinguished Alumnus Award for Research, Drexel University College of Medicine
- 2018 – Frederic C. Bartter Award, American Society of Bone and Mineral Metabolism
- 2020 – ESPE International Award, European Society for Paediatric Endocrinology
- 2021 – Lifetime Achievement Award, Human Growth Foundation
- 2021 – Inaugural Senior Investigator Award, Pediatric, Endocrine Society (USA)
- 2022 – Judson J. Van Wyk Prize, Pediatric Endocrine Society

== Published works ==
Levine has published over 500 original manuscripts, chapters and reviews. He has co-authored and edited three editions of the book The Parathyroids: Basic and Clinical Concepts. He co-authored the first edition with John P. Bilezikian and Robert Marcus in 1994. It served as a compendium that linked the basic science of parathyroid hormone with major clinical disorders, offering practical information for managing these conditions. This was followed by a second edition of the book. The Third Edition of The Parathyroids: Basic and Clinical Concepts covered significant updates in the field including on noninvasive imaging, fracture healing, secondary conditions like chronic kidney disease, and vitamin D metabolism.

=== Books ===
- The Parathyroids: Basic and Clinical Concepts (1994) ISBN 9780781700177
- The Parathyroids: Basic and Clinical Concepts (2001) ISBN 9780120986514
- The Parathyroids: Basic and Clinical Concepts (2014) ISBN 9780123971661

=== Selected journal articles ===
- Marx, S. J., Attie, M. F., Levine, M. A., Spiegel, A. M., DOWNS JR, R. W., & Lasker, R. D. (1981). The hypocalciuric or benign variant of familial hypercalcemia: clinical and biochemical features in fifteen kindreds. Medicine, 60(6), 397–412.
- Patten, J. L., Johns, D. R., Valle, D., Eil, C., Gruppuso, P. A., Steele, G., ... & Levine, M. A. (1990). Mutation in the gene encoding the stimulatory G protein of adenylate cyclase in Albright's hereditary osteodystrophy. New England Journal of Medicine, 322(20), 1412–1419.
- Schwindinger, W. F., Francomano, C. A., & Levine, M. A. (1992). Identification of a mutation in the gene encoding the alpha subunit of the stimulatory G protein of adenylyl cyclase in McCune-Albright syndrome. Proceedings of the National Academy of Sciences, 89(11), 5152–5156.
- Cheng, J. B., Levine, M. A., Bell, N. H., Mangelsdorf, D. J., & Russell, D. W. (2004). Genetic evidence that the human CYP2R1 enzyme is a key vitamin D 25-hydroxylase. Proceedings of the National Academy of Sciences, 101(20), 7711–7715.
- Roizen, J. D., Li, D., O’Lear, L., Javaid, M. K., Shaw, N. J., Ebeling, P. R., ... & Levine, M. A. (2018). CYP3A4 mutation causes vitamin D–dependent rickets type 3. The Journal of clinical investigation, 128(5), 1913–1918.
