= Mike Levine (newspaper writer) =

American journalist, columnist, and editor (1952–2007)

Mike Levine (May 2, 1952 in New York City, New York – January 14, 2007 in Monroe, New York) was an award-winning newspaper and magazine journalist, columnist, and editor, best known for his writing and leadership roles at the Times Herald-Record and ESPN.

== Career as a journalist, editor, and author ==
Levine began his writing career as the editor of Heights-Inwood. He began working at the Times-Herald Record in July 1980, and was assigned to cover stories in Sullivan County, New York for years. He became a regular columnist in 1983. His reporting was said to have a flair for sentimental human interest stories with an articulate and compassionate voice, mixed with wisdom, humor and old-fashioned journalistic muckraking. He worked his way up to Executive Editor in 1999, covering the Hudson Valley, Catskill, Ulster and Orange County regions. From 2001 to 2002, he was Senior Editor of ESPN The Magazine and from 2002, Executive Editor of the Times Herald-Record.

== Death ==
Levine died of a heart attack at home on January 14, 2007, and was survived by his wife (Ellen), four children, and a sister (Tedra).

== Legacy ==
The Mike Levine Journalism Education Fund was founded after his death. Beginning in 2010, the fund sponsors an annual training for aspiring writers at The Mike Levine Workshop in Livingston Manor, New York. The workshop is led with prominent writers serving as volunteers. In addition, an annual Mike Levine column 'Read-a-Thon' is held annually to raise money for the Education Fund. Levine is the first writer in the history of the Times-Herald Record for whom every article he had ever written has made available by online archive. The article listing online is free with click on links, but at present the archive does require a subscription to the Record's online service for access. A clip of Mr. Levine addressing his community is on YouTube.

== Free writings online ==
- The Miracle, April 1999 column Part I by Mike Levine
- The Miracle, April 1999 column Part II by Mike Levine
- The Miracle, April 1999 column Part III by Mike Levine
- First Day of School: Moments To Treasure
- Thanksgiving Bless In Memory of Debbie
- Somewhere in the Issues is the Truth
- Mike Levine's last column in the Times Herald-Record
