= Human Growth Foundation =

U.S. nonprofit organization

The Human Growth Foundation is a nonprofit group that works with people with growth deficiencies. It is financed mainly by Genentech and Caremark. In 1994, it published a study that concluded that 20,000 children needed human growth hormone because of their growth deficiencies.

The current president of the foundation is Pisit Pitukcheewanont.

== See also ==
- MAGIC Foundation
- Little People of America
