= Michael Levin (writer) =

American author, ghostwriter, and playwright

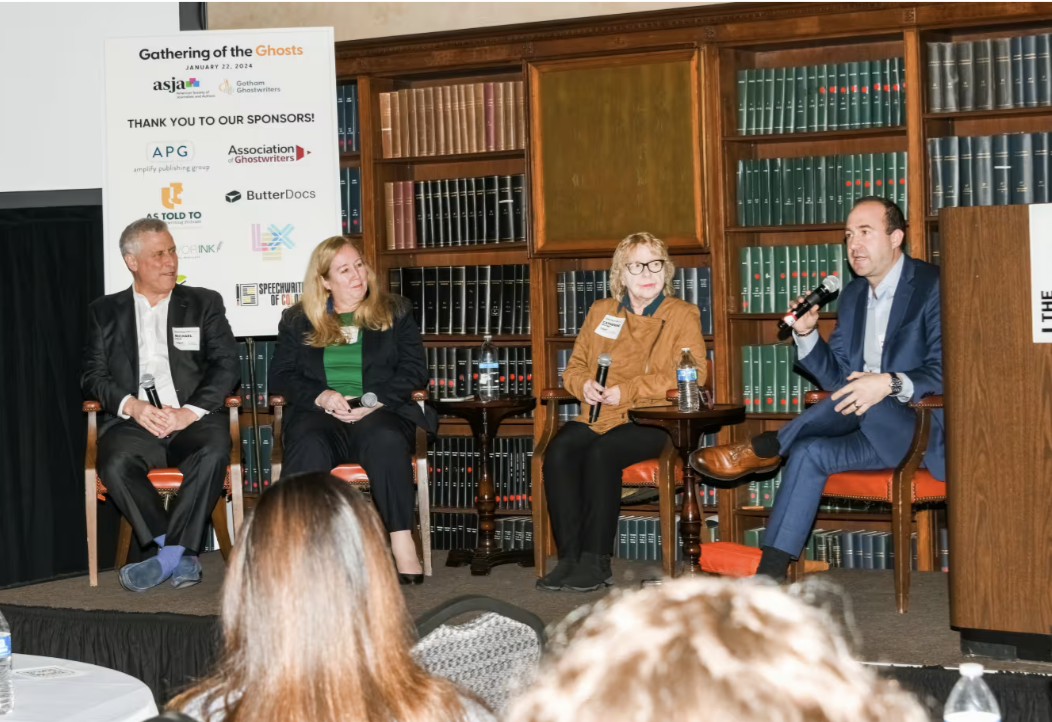
- Levin, left, in 2024
- Born: Michael Graubart Levin
- Education: Amherst College (BA); Columbia Law School (JD)
- Occupations: Author; ghostwriter; playwright
- Writing career
- Years active: 1985–present
- Notable works: Journey to Tradition; The Socratic Method; Settling the Score; Alive and Kicking

Michael Graubart Levin is an American author, ghostwriter, and playwright. He is the author of fiction and nonfiction books including Journey to Tradition, The Socratic Method, Settling the Score, and Alive and Kicking.

== Early life and education ==
Levin graduated from Amherst College in 1980 with a Bachelor of Arts in English and Ancient Greek. He later earned a Juris Doctor from Columbia Law School in 1985.

== Career ==
Levin began his writing career as a novelist and nonfiction author. His 1985 book Journey to Tradition: The Odyssey of a Born-Again Jew was reviewed in Tradition: A Journal of Orthodox Jewish Thought and Publishers Weekly.

His novel The Socratic Method, published by Simon & Schuster, received reviews in The New York Times, the Los Angeles Times, The New Yorker, and Law & Social Inquiry. Publishers Weekly also reviewed his novel Settling the Score. His 1994 novel Alive and Kicking was reviewed by The New York Times, the Los Angeles Times, and Publishers Weekly.

Levin later worked as a ghostwriter and book collaborator, including on books with Dave Winfield, Pat Summerall, Howard Bragman, John Hope Bryant, and Angela Harrelson. He founded the ghostwriting company BusinessGhost and sold the firm in 2018.

Levin book Making Jack Falcone, co-authored with Joaquin Garcia, was developed for film by Steven Soderbergh and Paramount Pictures. His novel Janine and Alex, Alex and Janine was adapted into the 2000 television film Model Behavior, which aired on ABC's The Wonderful World of Disney.

In 2023, Levin launched Jewish Leaders Books, an imprint focused on books by Jewish nonprofit and communal leaders.

=== Stage work ===
Levin wrote and performed a one-man show, Jenny Loves Me (originally titled The Mom Show), staged in Boston and New York City between 2021 and 2024.

In 2025, his musical Sober Songs premiered Off-Broadway at Theatre Row in New York City.

== Selected works ==
=== Sole author ===
- Journey to Tradition: The Odyssey of a Born-Again Jew. Jersey City: Ktav Publishing House. 1985. ISBN 0881250937.
- The Socratic Method. New York: Simon & Schuster. 1987. ISBN 067163867X.
- Settling the Score. New York: Simon & Schuster. 1990. ISBN 0671667610.
- Alive and Kicking. New York: St. Martin's Press. 1994. ISBN 0312953054.
- What Every Jew Needs to Know About God. Jersey City: Ktav Publishing House. 1997. ISBN 0881255378.
- Complete Idiot's Guide to Your Civil Liberties. New York: Alpha Books. 2003. ISBN 0028644735.
- Gutenberg to Google: The Rise and Fall of Books. Dallas: Brown Books. 2011.
- The Meaning of Your Life: Writing a Book About What Matters Most to You. New York: Meaning Company. 2024. ISBN 9798990719903.

=== As co-author or collaborator ===
- Levin, Michael; Winfield, Dave (2007). Dropping the Ball: Baseball's Troubles and How We Can and Must Solve Them. New York: Scribner. ISBN 9781416534488
- Levin, Michael; Christie, Doug; Christie, Jackie (2007). No Ordinary Love: A True Story of Marriage and Basketball. Infinite Love Publishing. ISBN 9780979482700.
- Levin, Michael; Garcia, Joaquin (2008). Making Jack Falcone: An Undercover FBI Agent Takes Down a Mafia Family. New York: Touchstone. ISBN 9781416551638.
- Levin, Michael; Abraham, Jay (2009). The Sticking Point Solution: 9 Ways to Move Your Business from Stagnation to Growth. New York: Vanguard Press. ISBN 9781593155100.
- Levin, Michael; Bragman, Howard (2009). Where's My Fifteen Minutes?. New York: Portfolio. ISBN 9781591842361.
- Levin, Michael; Summerall, Pat (2010). Giants: What I Learned About Life from Vince Lombardi and Tom Landry. Hoboken: John Wiley & Sons. ISBN 9780470611593.
- Levin, Michael; Hennings, Chad (2010). Rules of Engagement: Finding Faith and Purpose in a Disconnected World. Nashville: FaithWords. ISBN 9780446545396.
- Levin, Michael; Myers, Chris (2012). NASCAR Nation: How Racing's Values Mirror America's. New York: Random House. ISBN 9780771061189.
- Levin, Michael; Druck, Ken (2012). The Real Rules of Life: Balancing Life's Terms with Your Own. Carlsbad: Hay House. ISBN 9781401939717.
- Levin, Michael; Oliphant, David (2012). When All Else Fails, Sell!. New York: Reader's Digest Books. ISBN 9781606524299.
- Levin, Michael; Neesly, Carey (2013). Welcome Home Mama and Boris. New York: Reader's Digest. ISBN 9781621451150.
- Levin, Michael; Pannell, Jack (2017). Lunch Money Can't Shoot. New York: Morgan James Fiction. ISBN 9781683501107.
- Levin, Michael; Harrelson, Angela (2022). Lift Your Voice: How My Nephew George Floyd's Murder Changed the World. New York: Post Hill Press. ISBN 1637583370
- Levin, Michael; Bryant, John (2002). Banking on Our Future. Boston: Beacon Press. ISBN 0807047171.
