= International Pediatric Nephrology Association =

Medical association for child kidney disorders

- Founded: 1974; 52 years ago
- Type: Medical
- Purpose: Nephrology, kidney disease, global health, education
- Location: Kansas City
- Region served: Worldwide
- Website: theipna.org

The International Pediatric Nephrology Association (IPNA) is an association to promote the knowledge and communication among the pediatric nephrologists and improve the diagnosis, treatment and prevention of kidney disease at children around the world. IPNA has 1600 members representing 103 countries.

The IPNA evolved from a seminal international collaboration called The International Study of Kidney Disease in Children, which first met in London in 1966. This was the response to evaluate the use of medications to treat childhood nephrotic syndrome and correlate the outcomes with the use of renal biopsy and histological classification, and was initiated by Dr. Henry Barnett along with clinical investigators: Stuart Cameron, Gavin Arneil, Ransom Kuti, Kobyashi, and renal pathologists Dick White, Renee Habib, Jacob Churg, and Jay Bernstein. From that starting point, the European Society of Pediatric Nephrology emerged, followed by the American Society of Pediatric Nephrology in 1967. The first meeting of the IPNA was held in 1968 in Guadalajara, Mexico, under the leadership of Gustavo Gordillo. Thus, the first international collaboration of specialists caring for children with kidney disorders was formed. At that time, IPNA was also focused on finding support for developing countries to send pediatric nephrologists to the meetings and enhance education for the care of children with kidney disorders. In time, additional Regional Societies representing Pediatric Nephrology from around the world, formed and became Council members of the parent organization, IPNA.
