= Andrew Logan (songwriter) =

American songwriter

- Occupation: Songwriter
- Writing career
- Genres: Pop, rock, R&B
- Notable works: Best selling songs: Nobody's Angel - "I Can't Help Myself" "Wishin' on You" "We Are Family (Angel Style)"; Dakota Moon - "Another Day Goes By"; Andrew Logan - "Love Can Be Enough"
- Website: mcdonaldselznick.com/pr/msa/fall-out-boy.aspx

Andrew Logan is an American performer, songwriter, producer, and director.

== Background ==
Andrew Logan co-wrote the song "A Promise I Make" for the band Dakota Moon, which peaked at No. 69 on the Billboard chart, as well as peaking at No. 10 on the Adult Contemporary chart. He also co-wrote " Another Day Goes By" for Dakota Moon, which peaked at No. 19 on the Adult Contemporary chart. And he co-wrote "If That's Love" for Laura Pausini, which was a hit on the Dance chart, making it to No. 1.

== Career ==
Working with Michael Cruz, he wrote "Pieces of My Heart" which was recorded by John Lone for his Coming to My Own album that was released in 1990.

=== Solo album ===
Logan released his debut solo album, Show Me Your Heart, on Motown Records in 1993.

== Works ==
- Fall Out Boy, Young Wild Things US Tour, director
- Fall Out Boy, Honda Civic US Tour, director
- Panic! at the Disco, Nothing Rhymes with Circus US Tour, director
- Toni Braxton, Revealed at the Flamingo Hilton, Las Vegas, director
- Dave Koz, A Smooth Jazz Christmas, US Tour, director
- Toni Braxton, Libra US Tour, director
- Dave Koz, At the Movies US Tour, director
- Nobody's Angel, Can't Help Myself US Tour, director
- Toni Braxton, "Talking in His Sleep" music video, director
- Nights on Broadway II & III, musical director/vocal arranger
- Garth Brooks, "Snow in July", writer
- Paula Abdul, "Ooh La La La", producer
- Dakota Moon, "Dakota Moon", album producer
- Aaron Carter, "A Dream About You", producer
- Orfeh, What Do You Want from Me, writer/producer/co-executive producer

== As director ==
- 2008/2009 How Sweet the Sound, U.S Tour
- Fall Out Boy, "Young Wild Things Tour"/U.S Tour
- Toni Braxton, "Revealed" Flamingo Hilton, Las Vegas
- Panic! At The Disco, "Nothing Rhymes With Circus"/ U.S Tour"
- 2010 Stellar Awards, "Featuring Donald Lawrence & The Atlanta West Pentecostal Choir"
- 2010 NAACP Awards, "Mary Mary Performance"
- Mary Mary, "The Sound"/U.S Tour
- Toni Braxton, "Libra Tour"/ U.S Tour
- Fall Out Boy, "Honda Civic Tour"/U.S Tour
- Dave Koz
  - "A Smooth Jazz Christmas"/U.S Tour
  - "At The Movies"/U.S Tour
  - "Greatest Hits"/U.S Tour
- Toni Braxton
  - "Fox’s New Year's Eve"/Fox T.V.
  - "NBA All Star Game"/ Half Time Show TNT
  - "The White Party"/Palm Springs
- Nobody's Angel, "Can't Help Myself"/ U.S Tour
- Dakota Moon, "A Place To Land"/U.S Tour
- Nights on Broadway, 2 & 3/Caesars, Atlantic City (Musical Director/Vocal Arranger)

=== Music videos ===
- Dennis Logan, "The Whole Things Going Down"
- Toni Braxton, "Talking In His Sleep"/Revealed Las Vegas"
- Donald Lawrence, "Let The Word Do The Work"/ How Sweet The Sound"

=== Industrials ===
- Lea Michele, "Dove's Favorite Things"
- Lexus, Toyota, Axe Body Spray, Dove, Whirlpool, Burger King
