= Model Behavior =

2000 television film by Mark Rosman

- VHS cover
- Based on: Janine & Alex, Alex & Janine by Michael Graubart Levin
- Written by: David Kukoff; Matt Roshkow
- Directed by: Mark Rosman
- Starring: Maggie Lawson; Justin Timberlake; Kathie Lee Gifford
- Theme music composer: Eric Colvin; Orfeh
- Country of origin: United States
- Original language: English

Production
- Producers: Jack Brodsky; Ronald E. Frazier
- Cinematography: Laszlo George
- Editor: Bonnie Koehler
- Running time: 85 minutes
- Production companies: Karz Entertainment; Pacific Motion Pictures; Disney Telefilms

Original release
- Network: ABC
- Release: March 12, 2000

Model Behavior is a 2000 television film that aired on ABC's The Wonderful World of Disney anthology series. The film starred Maggie Lawson, Justin Timberlake in his film debut, and Kathie Lee Gifford, and was directed by Mark Rosman. It is based on the book Janine and Alex, Alex and Janine by Michael Graubart Levin. It is also a modern-day gender-bending take on the classic story The Prince and the Pauper by Mark Twain.

== Summary ==
Alex Burroughs is a shy, insecure teenage girl who dreams of becoming a fashion designer. While helping her father with his catering business at a party, she meets beautiful Janine Adams, a famous teen model. Meanwhile, Janine is fed up and miserable with her manager mother making her life nothing but work. Especially after not being home when she has her first book signing, because her younger brother Max is going on a publicity tour.

Through a strange coincidence, the girls meet and realize that they look identical to each other, the only real difference being that Alex has to wear glasses. Through this realization, Alex and Janine decide to swap places for one week. Janine gets a date with Eric Singer, the most popular guy in Alex’s school, while Alex gets to date Jason Sharp (Justin Timberlake), a young, gorgeous, but sweet, male model. However, she has to deal with Janine's domineering mother, Deirdre (Kathie Lee Gifford).

When they start their new life, they both end up with dates for Saturday. Even though they were supposed to change back Friday, they call each other up and extend the date. Janine warns Alex to stay away from Jason because she believes that he is using her for the attention. Meanwhile, Alex warns Janine to stay away from Eric Singer. Alex's younger brother Josh tries to reveal her "Janine" secret.

Towards the end when Alex wants to tell Jason that she is not Janine, but she is seen by Eric and he thinks she's cheating on him. Jason walks off on her as well. So Janine and Alex swap back the next morning. Alex is grounded but she goes to the ball and so does Janine, disguising herself as Alex.

After both families show up, everyone finds out their secret. The two are able to convince their families to not be so hard on them and Eric leaves the most popular girl in school, Mindy, to be with Janine. Jason shows up having seen Josh's tape which Alex sent to him to show him the truth and dances with her.

== Cast ==
- Maggie Lawson as:
  - Alex Burroughs
  - Janine Adams
- Justin Timberlake as Jason Sharpe, Alex's love interest
- Kathie Lee Gifford as Deirdre Adams, Janine's widowed mother
- Jim Abele as Ted Burroughs, Alex's father
- Daniel Clark as Josh Burroughs, Alex's younger brother
- Karen Hines as Monique, Janine's assistant
- Jesse Nilsson as Eric Singer, Mindy's boyfriend and Janine's love interest
- Cody Gifford as Max Adams, Janine's younger brother
- Vendela Kirsebom as herself
- Jake Steinfeld as himself
- Nobody's Angel as themselves
- Lisa Ng as Sharon, Alex's best friend
- Ramona Pringle as Mindy Kaylis, Alex's rival
- Ann Turnbull as Mrs. Burroughs, Alex's mother

== Crew ==
- Directed by Mark Rosman
- Writing credits
  - Michael Levin - Janine & Alex, Alex & Janine book
  - Matt Roshkow - teleplay
- Produced by
  - Jack Brodsky - co-producer
  - Mike Carz - executive producer

== Soundtrack ==
- "Here We Go" sung by *NSYNC (JC Chasez and Justin Timberlake)
- "Hello World" Performed by Belle Perez
- "Walking on Sunshine" Performed by Katrina & the Waves
- "Power to the Meek" Performed by Eurythmics
- "Let That Be Enough" Performed by Switchfoot
- "If You Wanna Dance" Performed by Nobody's Angel
- "Ooh La La La" Performed by Nobody's Angel
- "Wishing on You" Performed by Nobody's Angel
- "I Can't Help Myself" Performed by Nobody's Angel
- "Beautiful Thing" Performed by All Star United

== Reception ==
=== Critical response ===
On Rotten Tomatoes, Model Behavior has a 65% approval score based on 136 reviews and an average rating of 5.9/10; one review: "A cross between the Parent Trap and Freaky Friday, this Disney Channel movie introduces a new twist on the ol' switcheroo".
