= Height discrimination =

Prejudice or discrimination against individuals based on height

Height discrimination is prejudice or discrimination against individuals based on height. In principle, it refers to the discriminatory treatment against individuals whose height is not within the normal acceptable range of height in a population. Various studies have shown it to be a cause of bullying, commonly manifested as unconscious microaggressions.

Modern Western height discrimination originated in 19th century eugenic, Social Darwinist, and white supremacist movements, beginning with eugenicist Sir Francis Galton's observation of the correlation of human height between parents and offspring. These movements popularized pseudoscientific beliefs about the superiority of larger male stature, embodied by the Nazi height ideals within the social construct of the Aryan master race.

In contrast, historical accounts of height discrimination in antiquity are uncommon. Furthermore, there is strong archeological and anthropological evidence that historically average height varied naturally around a constant, but did not begin to dramatically increase until the twentieth century.

Research indicates that people often use height as heuristic proxy to judge social status and fitness, regardless of its accuracy. In related studies, men have been found to be more strongly judged based on height than women.

== Lexicology ==
The term heightism was coined by sociologist Saul Feldman in a paper titled "The presentation of shortness in everyday life—height and heightism in American society: Toward a sociology of stature", presented at the meeting of the American Sociological Association in 1971. Heightism was included in the Second Barnhart Dictionary of New English (1971) and had a further degree of popularization by Time magazine in a 1971 article on Feldman's paper.

The term heightism can also be seen as an example of the increase in popular usage of phrases, particularly those relating to prejudice and discrimination, patterned after that of the word sexism. Height discrimination can also come in the form of pejorative slang terms.

== Height and social discrimination ==
=== Employment wage and social experience discrimination ===
A 2004 study published in the Journal of Applied Psychology showed that height is strongly related to success for men. It showed that increase in height for men corresponds to increase in income after controlling for other social psychological variables like age and weight. That same year, a study published in the Journal of Political Economy conjectured a "height premium" and found that "a 1.8-percent increase in wages accompanies every additional inch [2.54 cm] of height". They also found that men's wages as adults could be linked to their height at age 16. The researchers found that on an average an increase in height by one inch (2.54 cm) at age 16 increased male adult wages by 2.6 percent. This is equal to an increase of approximately US$850 in 1996 annual earnings (or $1,740 in 2025). In other words, the height and corresponding social experiences of a taller male adolescent at age 16 would likely translate to higher wages in later adulthood as compared to a shorter male adolescent.

Recent findings suggest that height discrimination occurs most often against racial minorities. A 2007 study published in the Journal of Vocational Behavior found that African-Americans reported higher weight and height related discrimination. This discrimination was even higher in female employees.

In 2017, attorney and author Tanya Osensky published Shortchanged: Height Discrimination and Strategies for Social Change. The book examines the cultural, medical, and occupational issues that short people face, which are often deemed unimportant and disregarded. Osensky challenges heightism by disclosing some beneficial aspects of shortness and suggesting avenues of activism and change.

=== In business ===
Some jobs require a minimum height. For example, US Military pilots have to be 160 to 200 centimetres (63–79 in) tall with a sitting height of 86 to 102 centimetres (34–40 in). Other jobs require a maximum height or to be between a certain height range, such as flight attendant. These exceptions noted, in the great majority of cases a person's height would not seem to have an effect on how well they are able to perform their job. Nevertheless, studies have shown that short people are paid less than taller people, with disparities similar in magnitude to the race and gender gaps.

Surveys have uncovered that less than 3% of CEOs were below 1.70 m (5 ft 7 in) in height, and 90% of CEOs are of above average height.

=== Sexual attractiveness ===
Initial studies indicated that taller men are more likely to be married and to have more children, except in societies with severe sex imbalances caused by war. Research by Dan Ariely found that American women exhibit a marked preference for dating taller men, and that for shorter men to be judged attractive by women, they must earn substantially more money than taller men. Also, the perceived attractiveness of taller men may also apply to men of average height. A study showed that there is not a notable difference between the perceived attractiveness of taller men and average height men when compared to each other. Rather, it's that shorter men are more unfavorably viewed and the increased preference for the other two groups are a possible side effect.

A 2012 study of Indonesian men and women found that both men and women are willing to excuse height differences by using a trade-off approach. Men may compensate 1.3 BMI units with a 1 percent higher wage than their wife. Women may compensate 2 BMI units with an additional year of higher education. Furthermore, a 2015 study found that both men and women receive economic benefits from having a tall spouse.

Nonetheless, on a cultural level in post-industrial society, a sociological relationship between height and perceived attractiveness exists. For instance, in a 2019 survey performed by Ipsos in Hungary with over 500 respondents, the perfect height for men for 53% of participants was between 1.78 m (5 ft 10 in) to 1.85 m (6 ft 1 in), while regarding female ideal height, 60% of respondents stated that it should be between 1.65 m (5 ft 5 in) and 1.75 m (5 ft 9 in), indicating a predominant preference for average to moderately tall height in both sexes. A study produced by the Universities of Groningen and Valencia, found that the taller a man was, the less anxious he felt about attractive, physically dominant, and socially powerful rivals. This cultural characteristic of conferring relevance to height as an indicator of attractiveness, while applicable to the modernized world, is not a transcendental human quality.

=== In media ===
In 1987 the BBC comedy series A Small Problem imagined a totalitarian society in which people under the height of 5 feet (1.5 m) were systematically discriminated against. The program attracted considerable criticism and complaints which accused the writers of reinforcing prejudice and of using offensive terms; the writers responded that their intention had been to show all prejudice was stupid and that height was chosen randomly.

S&M Short and Male, a documentary aired in 2008, demonstrated the obstacles and bigotry that short statured men face every day in life, love and work.

The 2019 teen romantic comedy Tall Girl tells the story of a 16-year-old girl who struggles in high school due to her height.

== Law ==
In the US, Michigan is the one state that prohibits height discrimination. Three American cities currently prohibit height discrimination: Santa Cruz, California, San Francisco, California, and New York City; New York City prohibits it in employment, housing, and public accommodations. The District of Columbia prohibits discrimination based on personal appearance. Ontario, Canada, prohibits height discrimination under the human rights code. Victoria, Australia, prohibits discrimination based on physical features, including height, under the Equal Opportunity Act of 2010.

Examples of successful legal battles pursued against height discrimination in the workplace include a 2002 case involving highly qualified applicants being turned down for jobs at a bank because they were considered too short; a 2005 Swedish case involving an unfair height requirement for employment implemented by Volvo; and a 1999 case involving a Kohler Company informal practice not to consider women who applied for jobs unless they were at least 5 ft 4 in (1.63 m) tall. Height requirements for employment which are not a bona fide occupational requirement are becoming less common. In 2022, the Supreme Court of Spain ruled that height requirements for joining the National Police Corps must take into account the average height for each sex in the Spanish population, disallowing a previous height rule for women.

== Height and mental health in men ==
Height is related to body image and does have an effect on the cognitive process. A study done involving spatial attention showed that people who were unhappy with their height were prone to looking quicker to short-associated words and tried to avoid attention to tall connected words because they could illicit negative feelings. Which could be caused when the participants with a dismal body image are exposed to their desired height, it creates an internal conflict, that they would like to lessen by facing away. This would potentially confirm agitation in individuals who are not satisfied with their height.

A research report published in the American Journal of Psychiatry found a strong inverse association between height and suicide in Swedish men. In other words, the suicide rate was higher for shorter men. This may signify the importance of childhood exposure in the etiology of adult mental disorder or reflect stigmatization or discrimination encountered by short men in their adult lives. A record linkage study of the birth, conscription, mortality, family, and census register data of 1,299,177 Swedish men followed from age 18 to a maximum of age 49 was performed and it was found that a 5 cm (2 in) increase in height was associated with a 9% decrease in suicide risk.

Another study involving was conducted involving suicide and height for men, specifically relating to suicide attempts. It looked into hospital admissions of Swedish men and found that the risk of suicide declined when height increased. There were strong correlations between social class and height in the participants, particularly shorter men of lower status had a higher suicide probability. Also those of low socioeconomic standing could be more susceptible to health problems that cause shortness, and were more vulnerable to psychiatric illnesses.

For other forms of discrimination there is without a doubt some form of psychological harm on the individual. However, for height discrimination, it can be disputable. Research has shown that heightism has arguably little effect on any aspects of someone's quality of life, including mental state. Only individuals on the high end range of short and tall have experienced some moderate impact on physical performance. Furthermore, majority of the potential negative mental health effects individuals could have came from internally, height discontentment, and it was relatively small compared to overall livelihood. While there is an increase in negative treatment towards individuals in the height area of less than 175 cm (5 ft 9 in), it was mild in totality and only a small percentage of the overall study group reported it. The correlation between heightism and the well-being of someone was found to be small.
