= Orfeh =

American singer, songwriter and actress

- Orfeh in 2026
- Born: Orfeh Alimorad; March 28, 1971 (age 55); New York City, U.S.
- Occupations: Singer; songwriter; actress
- Spouse: Andy Karl (m. 2001; sep. 2024)
- Website: orfeh.com

Orfeh (born March 28, 1971 as Orfeh Alimorad) is an American singer, songwriter and actress. She dropped her last name in 1996 and goes by her first name only. She performed at the Lincoln Center's American Songbook Series in 2016, and in the Broadway musicals Saturday Night Fever, Legally Blonde, Pretty Woman, and Chicago. She made her West End debut in Burlesque the Musical at London's Savoy Theatre in July 2025, originating the role of Tess. She is the co-producer of The Lost Boys and Galileo.

== Early life and career ==
Orfeh was born and raised in Murray Hill, New York City. She attended the LaGuardia High School for the Performing Arts and received a record deal shortly after graduation. Her first release was Life in the Movies, which she released as a part of the group Genevha with her musical partner Mike More in 1987. After the release, the duo formed the group Or-N-More and signed with EMI Records.

In 1991, the duo released a self-titled album, their single "Everyotherday" reached number 46 on the Billboard Hot 100. The album was awarded gold status, but shortly after the album's success, the duo found out their business manager had mis-managed their finances. She has been quoted about the situation, "My recording career went wrong. Really, really wrong. We had the business manager that stole all the money, the hit record that was about to become a mega-hit record and suddenly the rug was pulled out from under us. After being on the road for years and devoting my life to recording, I found myself at home saying, 'What do I do now?'"

After Or-N-More disbanded, Orfeh signed a publishing deal with Warner/Chappell Music and continued to write and produce songs for other artists. She also remains a member of the National Academy of Recording Arts and Sciences, which gives her nominating and voting privileges for the Grammy Awards. She also co-wrote the song "Wishing On You," which appears on the soundtrack of the Disney film Model Behavior that was released in 2000.

== Career ==
=== Theatre ===
Orfeh made her Broadway debut in 1998 as a swing in Footloose. In early 1999, Orfeh joined the ten-member company of The Gershwins 'Fascinating Rhythm' with Adriane Lenox, Sara Ramirez and Patrick Wilson. She then starred in the Original Broadway Company of London musical of Saturday Night Fever as Annette, and in addition to winning positive reviews, Orfeh met her former husband, Andy Karl, while playing the role. In 1999, she appeared on The Rosie O'Donnell Show to promote the musical and perform her solo from the show, If I Can't Have You.

After Saturday Night Fever closed, Orfeh starred in Me and Mrs. Jones and Bright Lights, Big City at the Prince Theatre in Philadelphia. In 2001, she played Janis Joplin in the off-Broadway show, Love, Janis. In 2005, she starred in the off-Broadway musical The Great American Trailer Park Musical as Pippi, a stripper from the wrong side of the tracks.

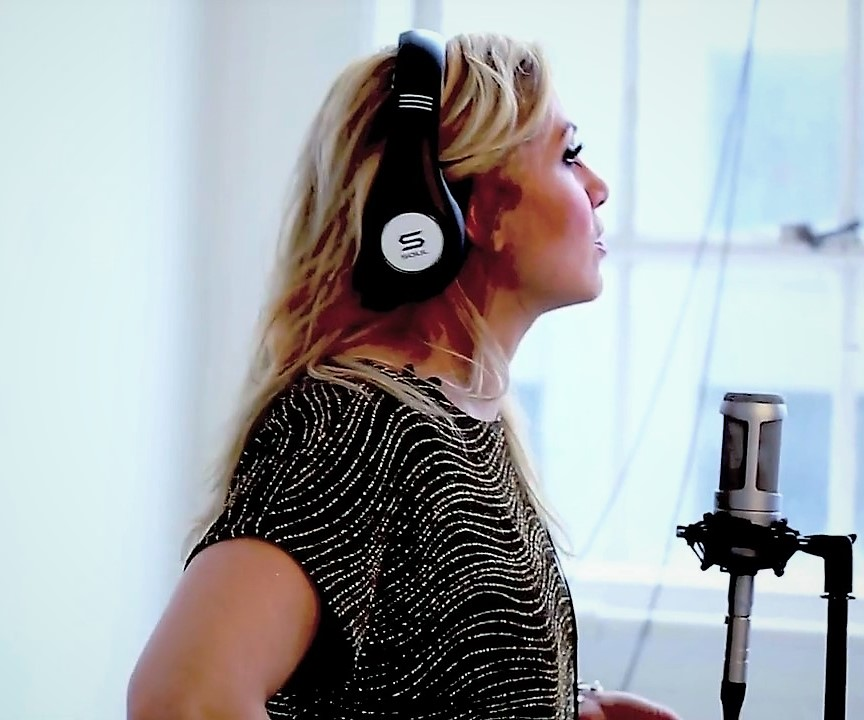
Orfeh singing in the "Make It Fair" video, 2015

In 2007, Orfeh was nominated for a Tony Award for her performance in the Legally Blonde musical. She played the role of Paulette, a down on her luck hairdresser who helps Elle on her journey, while finding love of her own. She also received Outer Critics Circle and Drama Desk nominations for her performance. Her husband at the time, Andy Karl, starred opposite her as her UPS man, Kyle. Orfeh stayed with the show until it closed on October 19, 2008. From July 20, 2018, through August 18, 2019, she played the role of Kit De Luca in Pretty Woman on Broadway. In February 2020, she played in an Off-Broadway 50th anniversary concert version of Joseph and the Amazing Technicolor Dreamcoat as Potiphar's Wife, playing opposite her former husband Andy Karl who played Potiphar.

In August 2024, she joined the cast of Chicago on Broadway as Matron "Mama" Morton for a limited engagement.

On May 27, 2025, it was announced that Orfeh would make her West End debut, originating the role of Tess in the musical Burlesque. The show was staged at London's Savoy Theatre, beginning on July 10, 2025.

=== Television and film ===
Orfeh has guest starred in several television shows, appearing in episodes of Gossip Girl, Law & Order: Special Victims Unit, Law & Order: Criminal Intent, and Sex and the City. In addition to television appearances, she is a frequently used voiceover artist and has voiced characters for the video games Max Payne 2: The Fall of Max Payne (2003), Grand Theft Auto: San Andreas (2004) and The Warriors (2005). She also has done voiceover work for Wachovia bank.

=== Music ===
Orfeh released her debut solo studio album, What Do You Want from Me, on September 30, 2008. In 2014, Orfeh recorded a song for Michael Mott's album, Where the Sky Ends which was later released as a dance mix. In 2015, she released the Christmas-themed single Christmas (Baby Please Come Home). In 2016, Orfeh and her former husband performed at the Lincoln Center's American Songbook series. That same year, she was featured on the single What the World Needs Now is Love with other Broadway artists and released the solo single, Forget My Name.

In 2017, Orfeh and her former husband, Andy Karl released a live concert album recorded at 54 Below titled, Legally Bound: Live at Feinstein's/54 Below. She also released a mash-up single of "Yesterday"/"Time After Time"/"Shallow" with Karl and American singer/songwriter, Andrew Logan in 2021. She released a cover single of the Eagles' song, "Hotel California", on October 20, 2023.

In 2025 she released "Hurt Me", "Live My Life" and "Peep Show". in 2026, Orfeh released the single "Back In Love Again" with Jimmy Grecoand "Love Is Like Dancing" with DJ Martinee

Orfeh continues to perform with her band in NYC. She recently has been performing her own show called "Unbound".

== Personal life ==
In 2001, Orfeh married actor and singer Andy Karl, who she met during her time in Saturday Night Fever, and who played opposite her as Paulette's UPS man, Kyle, in the original cast of Legally Blonde. Orfeh and Karl performed together in Me and Mrs. Jones, Nights on Broadway II, Bright Lights, Big City, Legally Blonde, Pretty Woman: The Musical, and Joseph and the Amazing Technicolor Dreamcoat. In May 2024, Karl announced they had separated after 23 years of marriage.

== Discography ==
Releases

Artist/album	Date	Label	Credits
Genevha with Mike More/Life in the Movies	(1987)	CBS Associated Records	Vocals
Or-N-More/Or-N-More	(1991)	EMI America	Vocals/writing
The O'Jays/Emotionally Yours	(1991)	EMI America	Vocals
Freedom Williams/Freedom	(1993)	Columbia Records	Vocals
Various Artists/Model Behavior Soundtrack	(2000)	Disney	Writer
Deborah Gibson/M.Y.O.B	(2001)	Golden Egg Records	Vocals
Actors Fund of America/Dreamgirls	(2002)	Nonesuch Records	Vocals, photography
Actors Fund of America/Hair (Benefit recording)	(2004)	Ghostlight Records	Vocals
The Great American Trailer Park Musical/ Cast Recording	(2005)	Ghostlight Records	Vocals
Various Artists/Carols For a Cure Volume 7	(2005)	Rock-it Science Records	Vocals
Legally Blonde/Cast Recording	(2007)	Ghostlight Records	Vocals
Various artists/Carols For a Cure Volume 9	(2007)	Rock-it Science Records	Vocals
Orfeh/What Do You Want From Me	(2008)	Ghostlight Records	Vocals, executive producer
Various artists/Carols For a Cure 14	(2012)	Rock-it Science Records	Vocals
Michael Mott/Where The Sky Ends	(2014)	Broadway Records	Writing
Michael Mott/Where the Sky Ends:The Dance Remixes	(2014)	Broadway Records	Vocals, writing
Orfeh/Christmas (Baby Please Come Home)	(2015)	Orfenator Music	Vocals
Broadway for Orlando/What the World Needs Now is Love	(2016)	Broadway Records	Vocals
Orfeh/Forget My Name	(2016)	Kismet Music Inc	Vocals
Pretty Woman: The Musical/Cast Recording	(2018)	Atlantic Records	Vocals
Orfeh/Forever I Do	(2023)	Orfenator Music	Vocals
Orfeh/Hotel California	(2023)	Orfenator Music	Vocals
Orfeh/Peep Show	(2025)	Orfenator Music, in partnership with FMedia Corp	Vocals
Orfeh/Hurt Me	(2025)	Orfenator Music, in partnership with FMedia Corp	Vocals
Orfeh/Live My Life	(2025)	Orfenator Music, in partnership with FMedia Corp	Vocals
Orfeh and Jimmy Greco/Back in Love Again	(2026)	Soul Azul Music	Vocals
Burlesque: The Musical/Cast Recording	(2026)	Masterworks Broadway (Sony Music Entertainment)	Vocals
Orfeh and DJ Martinee/Love Is Like Dancing	(2026)	EMPIRE Distribution / GT Digital	Vocals

== Stage credits ==
Year	Title	Role	Venue	Ref.
1999	Footloose	Swing and understudy for Betty Blast, Irene, and Wendy Jo. Rusty	Broadway, Richard Rodgers Theatre	
1999	The Gershwins' Fascinating Rhythm	Performer	Broadway, Longacre Theatre	
1999	Saturday Night Fever	Annette	Broadway, Minskoff Theatre	
2001	Dreamgirls	Photographer	Benefit Concert, Ford Center for the Performing Arts	
2004	Hair	Performer	Benefit Concert, New Amsterdam Theatre	
2005	The Great American Trailer Park Musical	Pippi	Off-Broadway, Dodger Stages	
2007	Legally Blonde	Paulette	Broadway, Palace Theatre	
2011	Love, Loss, and What I Wore	Performer	Off-Broadway, Westside Theatre	
2018	Pretty Woman	Kit	Chicago, Nederlander Theatre	
2018	Pretty Woman	Kit	Broadway, Nederlander Theatre	
2020	Joseph and the Amazing Technicolor Dreamcoat	Mrs. Potiphar	Benefit Concert, Lincoln Center Theater	
2023	The Radium Girls	Performer	Reading, The New 42nd Street Studios	
2024	Chicago	Matron 'Mama' Morton	Broadway, Ambassador Theatre	
2025	Little Black Book	Heidi Fleiss	Bowery Ballroom	
2025	Burlesque	Tess	West End, Savoy Theatre	
2025	Exorcistic: The Rock Musical	Herself	Off-Broadway, The Asylum Theatre	
2026	Dear Evan Hansen	Heidi Hansen	Massachusetts, Harbour Lights Theatre	

== Awards and nominations ==
Year	Award	Category	Work	Result	Ref.
2006	Grammy Award	Best Musical Theater Album	Hair	Nominated	
2007	Tony Award	Best Performance by a Featured Actress in a Musical	Legally Blonde	Nominated	
2007	Drama Desk Award	Outstanding Featured Actress in a Musical	Legally Blonde	Nominated	
2007	Outer Critics Circle Award	Outstanding Featured Actress in a Musical	Legally Blonde	Nominated	
2026	Tony Award	Best Musical (as a co-producer)	The Lost Boys	Nominated	
