= Mike Levin (paediatrician) =

Michael Levin MBE FMedSci is professor of paediatrics and international child health at Imperial College London.

He has led research on how to diagnose and treat illnesses such as meningococcal disease, tuberculosis, bacterial sepsis, and Kawasaki disease.

In 2020, he received €22.5 million in EU funding to create a quick test for serious illnesses, called the DIAMONDS project.
