= Bone age =

Degree of a person's skeletal development

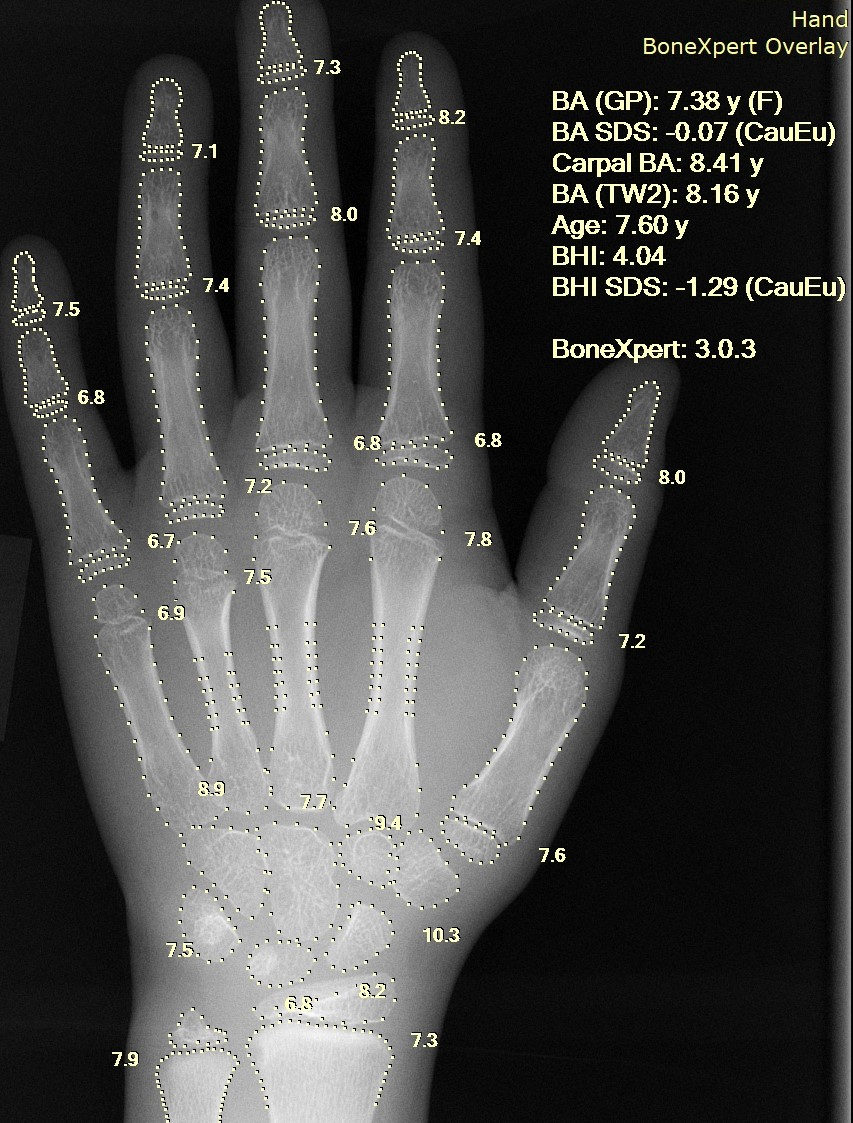
X-ray of a left hand, with automatic calculation of bone age by a computer software

Bone age is the degree of a person's skeletal development. In children, bone age serves as a measure of physiological maturity and aids in the diagnosis of growth abnormalities, endocrine disorders, and other medical conditions. As a person grows from fetal life through childhood, puberty, and finishes growth as a young adult, the bones of the skeleton change in size and shape. These changes can be seen by x-ray and other imaging techniques. A comparison between the appearance of a patient's bones to a standard set of bone images known to be representative of the average bone shape and size for a given age can be used to assign a "bone age" to the patient.

Bone age is distinct from an individual's biological or chronological age, which is the amount of time that has elapsed since birth. Discrepancies between bone age and biological age can be seen in people with stunted growth, where bone age may be less than biological age. Similarly, a bone age that is older than a person's chronological age may be detected in a child growing faster than normal. A delay or advance in bone age is most commonly associated with normal variability in growth, but significant deviations between bone age and biological age may indicate an underlying medical condition that requires treatment. A child's current height and bone age can be used to predict adult height. Other uses of bone age measurements include assisting in the diagnosis of medical conditions affecting children, such as constitutional growth delay, precocious puberty, thyroid dysfunction, growth hormone deficiency, and other causes of abnormally short or tall stature.

In the United States, the most common technique for estimating a person's bone age is to compare an x-ray of the patient's left hand and wrist to a reference atlas containing x-ray images of the left hands of children considered to be representative of how the skeletal structure of the hand appears for the average person at a given age. A paediatric radiologist specially trained in estimating bone age assesses the patient's x-ray for growth, shape, size, and other bone features. The image in the reference atlas that most closely resembles the patient's x-ray is then used to assign a bone age to the patient. Other techniques for estimating bone age exist, including x-ray comparisons of the bones of the knee or elbow to a reference atlas and magnetic resonance imaging approaches.

== Measurement techniques ==
Estimating the bone age of a living child is typically performed by comparing images of their bones to images of models of the average skeleton for a given age and sex acquired from healthy children and compiled in an atlas. Features of bone development assessed in determining bone age include the presence of bones (have certain bones ossified yet), the size and shape of bones, the amount of mineralization (also called ossification), and the degree of fusion between the epiphyses and metaphyses. The first atlas published in 1898 by John Poland consisted of x-ray images of the left hand and wrist. Since then, updated atlases of the left hand and wrist have appeared, along with atlases of the foot and ankle, knee, and elbow. An alternative approach to the atlas method just described is the so-called "single-bone method" where maturity scales are assigned to individual bones. Here, a selection of bones are given a score based on their perceived development, a sum is totaled based on the individual bone scores, and the sum is correlated to a final bone age.

=== Evaluation of the bones of the hand and wrist ===
The two most common techniques for estimating bone age are based on a posterior-anterior x-ray of a patient's left hand, fingers, and wrist. The reason for imaging only the left hand and wrist are that a hand is easily x-rayed with minimal radiation and shows many bones in a single view. Further, most people are right-hand dominant and the left hand is therefore less likely to be deformed due to trauma. Finally, only the wrist and hand are imaged out of a desire to minimize the amount of potentially harmful ionizing radiation delivered to a child.

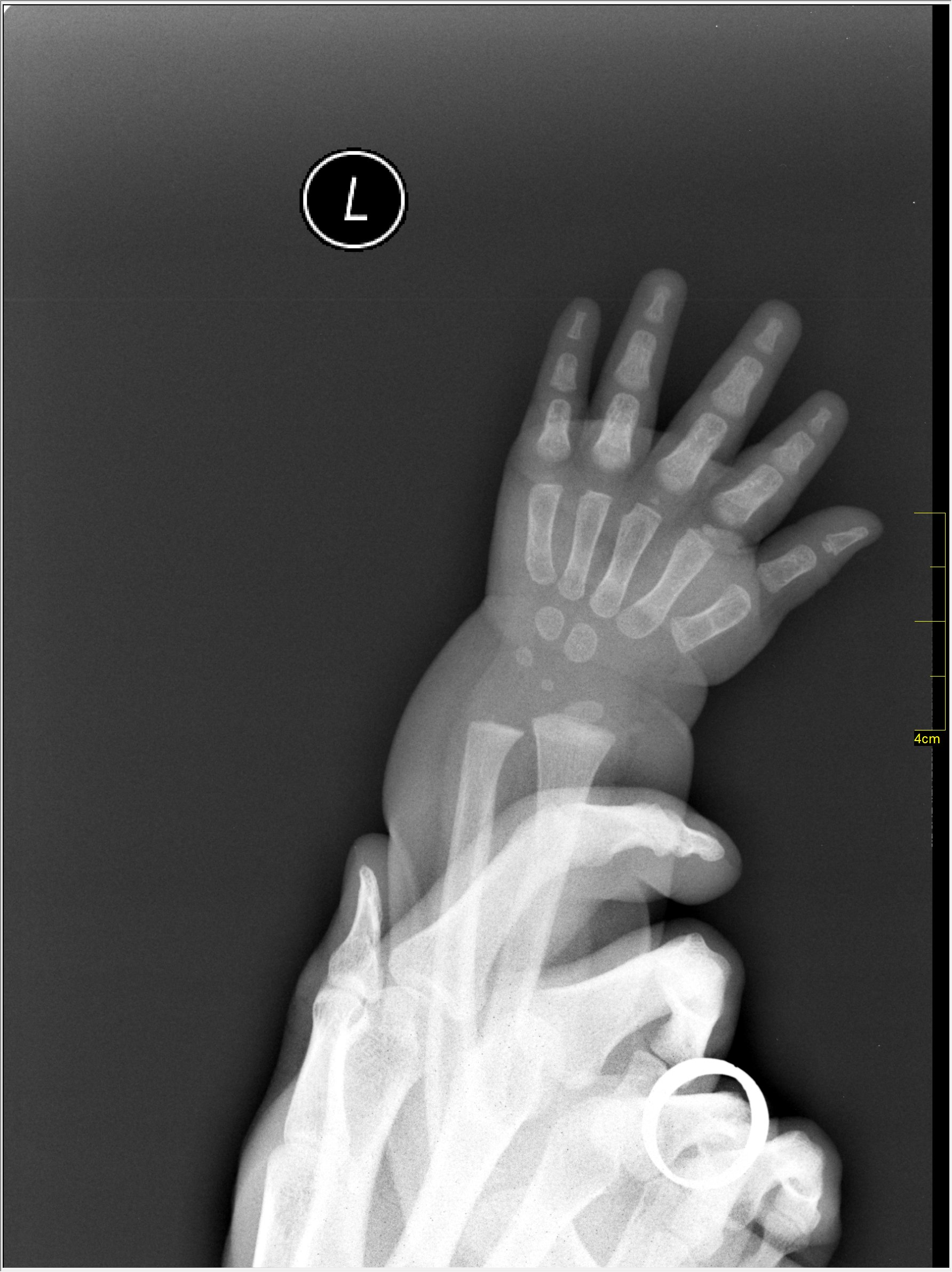
X-ray film of an infant's left hand

==== Greulich and Pyle atlas ====
In the United States, bone age is usually determined by comparing an x-ray of the patient's left hand and wrist to a set of reference images contained in the Greulich and Pyle atlas. Drs. William Walter Greulich and Sarah Idell Pyle published the first edition of their standard reference atlas of x-ray images of the left hands and wrists of boys and girls in 1950. The Greulich and Pyle atlas contains x-ray images of the left hands and wrists of different children deemed to be good models of the average appearance of the bones of the hand at a given age. The atlas has a set of images arranged in chronological order by age for males ranging from 3 months to 19 years and for females ranging from 3 months to 18 years in varying intervals of 3 months to 1 year.

Images in the Greulich and Pyle atlas came from healthy white boys and girls enrolled in the Brush Foundation Study for Human Growth and Development between the years 1931 and 1942.

To assign a bone age to the patient under review, a radiologist compares the patient's hand and wrist x-ray to images in the Greulich and Pyle atlas. Assessment of the carpals, metacarpals, and phalanges are used to find the closest match in the atlas; the chronological age of the patient in the atlas becomes the bone age assigned to the patient under review. If a patient's x-ray is found to be very close in appearance to two contiguous images in the atlas, then an average of the chronological ages in the atlas may be used as the patient's bone age, although some evaluators choose to interpolate the closest age while others report a range of possible bone ages.

A drawback associated with the Greulich and Pyle method of assessing bone age is that it relies on x-ray imaging and therefore requires exposing the patient to ionizing radiation. Further, there can be moderate levels of variability in the bone ages assigned to the same patient by different assessors. Other downsides are that the atlas has not been updated since 1959 and the images in the atlas were acquired from healthy white children living in Cleveland, Ohio in the 1930s and 1940s and therefore may not yield accurate bone age assignments when applied to non-white patients or unhealthy children.

Bones of the hand and wrist used for bone age estimation in the Tanner-Whitehouse method.

==== Tanner-Whitehouse method ====
The Tanner-Whitehouse (TW) technique of estimating bone is a "single-bone method" based on an x-ray image of a patient's left hand and wrist. There have been two updates since the first publication of the TW method in 1962: the TW2 method in 1975 and the TW3 method in 2001. The TW methods consist of evaluating individual bones and assigning a letter grade to each bone based on its degree of maturation. Next, the scores for all evaluated bones are compiled into a sum, and that sum is correlated to bone age through a lookup table for males or females depending on the sex of the patient.

The bones considered in the TW3 method include the distal radius and ulna, the metacarpals and phalanges of the 1st, 3rd, and 5th fingers, and all of the carpal bones except the pisiform.

=== Knee maturation ===
An atlas based on knee maturation has also been compiled.

=== Hemiskeleton method ===
The bones in the hand a wrist in a newborn do not change much in the first year of life. However, most pediatric radiologists still use the Greulich and Pyle technique for estimating bone age in infancy. Alternative techniques for estimating bone age in infancy include tallying the number of ossification centers present in the left half of the infant's body requiring a hemiskeleton x-ray. One common method based on x-rays of the hemiskeleton is the Sontag method. This technique was created to avoid errors in estimating bone age thought to arise from focusing on only one area of the body. The Sontag method uses x-rays of all the bones and joints of the upper and lower limbs on the left side of the body. Then, a radiologist counts the number of ossification centers present and uses a chart to convert the sum of ossification centers to a bone age. There is a chart for males and another for females with possible bone ages ranging from 1 month to 5 years. Since most of the ossification centers counted using this technique appear early in life, this method is only valid for measuring bone age up to around 5 years of age.

=== Evaluation of cervical vertebrae ===
Lamparski (1972) used the cervical vertebrae and found them to be as reliable and valid as the hand-wrist area for assessing skeletal age. He developed a series of standards for the assessment of skeletal age for both males and females. This method has the advantage of eliminating the need for additional radiographic exposure in cases where the vertebrae have already been recorded on a lateral cephalometric radiographic. This method is called the Cervical vertebral maturation method.

Hassel & Farman (1995) developed an index based on the second, third, and fourth cervical vertebrae (C2, C3, C4) and proved that atlas maturation was highly correlated with skeletal maturation of the hand-wrist. Several smartphone applications have been developed to facilitate the use of vertebral methods such as Easy Age.

== Clinical significance ==
Assessment of a patient's bone age is used in pediatric medicine to help determine if a child is growing normally. Large differences between a person's bone age and their chronological age may indicate a growth disorder. For example, a patient's bone age may be less than their chronological age suggesting a delay in growth as may be caused by a growth hormone deficiency. In the case of too much growth hormone, a child may have a bone age that is older than their chronological age suggesting that they are growing abnormally fast. Since bone age measurements are inherently approximations, they are conventionally reported with a standard deviation which serves as an estimate of the associated error. For a child's bone age to be considered abnormal, the chronological age must differ from the assigned bone age by more than 2 standard deviations.

Bone age acts as a surrogate for physiological development because growth and maturation of the skeletal system depend on the presence of hormones like growth hormone, sex steroids (e.g., estrogen and testosterone), and thyroxine. Studies of bone age in children allow physicians to correlate a child's current height and bone age to their predicted future maximum height in adulthood.

Not only can bone age help in diagnosing a child with a growth abnormality, but it can also play a role in treatment. In certain instances, abnormal growth conditions may be treated with supplemental hormone therapy. The best time to start and stop such therapies can be determined based on a patient's bone age.

=== Height prediction ===
Statistics have been compiled to indicate the percentage of height growth remaining at a given bone age. By simple arithmetic, a predicted adult height can be computed from a child's height and bone age. Separate tables are used for boys and girls because of the sex difference in timing of puberty, and slightly different percentages are used for children with unusually advanced or delayed bone maturation. These tables, the Bayley-Pinneau tables, are included as an appendix in the Greulich and Pyle atlas.

In several conditions involving atypical growth, bone age height predictions are less accurate. For example, in children born small for gestational age who remain short after birth, bone age is a poor predictor of adult height.

=== Evaluation of growth abnormalities ===
For the average person with average puberty, the bone age would match the person's chronological age. In terms of height growth and height growth related to bone age, average females stop growing taller two years earlier than average males. Peak height velocity (PHV) occurs at the average age of 11 years for girls and at the average age of 13 years for boys. While there is no exact age for the culmination of bone maturity, modern research suggests a range of between 15-17 years for bone maturity in boys and 14-16 years for girls.

There are exceptions with people who have an advanced bone age (bone age is older than chronological age) due to being an early bloomer (someone starting puberty and hitting PHV earlier than average), being an early bloomer with precocious puberty, or having another condition. There are also exceptions with people who have a delayed bone age (bone age is younger than chronological age) due to being a late bloomer (someone starting puberty and hitting PHV later than average), being a late bloomer with delayed puberty, or having another condition.

An advanced bone age is common when a child has had prolonged elevation of sex steroid levels, as in precocious puberty or congenital adrenal hyperplasia. The bone age is often marginally advanced with premature adrenarche, when a child is overweight from a young age or when a child has lipodystrophy. Those with an advanced bone age typically hit a growth spurt early on but stop growing at an earlier age. Bone age may be significantly advanced in genetic overgrowth syndromes, such as Sotos syndrome, Beckwith-Wiedemann syndrome and Marshall-Smith syndrome.

Bone maturation is delayed with the variation of normal development termed constitutional delay of growth and puberty, but delay also accompanies growth failure due to growth hormone deficiency and hypothyroidism.

Recent studies show that organs like the liver can also be used to estimate age and sex, because of the unique feature of liver. Liver weight increases with age and is different between males and females. Thus, the liver can be employed in special medico-legal cases of skeletal deformities or mutilation.

A table of possible causes of abnormal stature and the expected bone age associated with each condition is provided below.

Bone age and disease
Diagnosis	Stature	Pace of puberty	Bone age
Intrinsic short stature	Short	Normal	Normal
Constitutional delay in growth and development	Short	Delayed	Delayed
Growth hormone deficiency	Short		Delayed
Growth hormone insensitivity syndrome	Short		Delayed
Hypothyroidism	Short		Delayed
Cushing's syndrome	Short		Delayed
Coeliac disease	Short	Delayed	Delayed
Russell-Silver syndrome	Short	Advanced	Delayed
Intrinsic tall stature	Tall	Normal	Normal
Constitutional advance in growth and development	Tall	Advanced	Advanced
Hyperthyroidism	Tall		Advanced
Marshall-Smith syndrome	Tall		Advanced
Precocious puberty	Tall	Advanced	Advanced
Growth hormone excess	Tall		Advanced
Hypogonadism	Tall		Advanced
Obesity	Tall	Advanced	Advanced

== Physiology ==
Formation of the human skeletal system begins in fetal life with the development of a loosely ordered connective tissue known as mesenchyme. The cells of the mesenchyme can become bone by one of two primary methods: (1) intramembranous ossification where mesenchymal cells differentiate directly into bone or (2) endochondral ossification where mesenchymal cells become a cartilaginous model of chondrocytes which then become bone. The bones of the limbs form and lengthen through endochondral ossification beginning by the 12th week after fertilization.

At birth, only the metaphyses of the "long bones" are present. The long bones are those that grow primarily by elongation at an epiphysis at one end of the growing bone. The long bones include the femurs, tibias, and fibulas of the lower limb, the humeri, radii, and ulnas of the upper limb (arm + forearm), and the phalanges of the fingers and toes. The long bones of the leg comprise nearly half of adult height. The other primary skeletal component of height is the spine and skull.

Schematic of a right human hand depicting the order of emergence of the carpal bones during human growth and development

As a child grows the epiphyses become calcified and appear on x-rays, as do the carpal and tarsal bones of the hands and feet, separated on x-rays by a layer of invisible cartilage where most of the growth is occurring. As sex steroid levels rise during puberty, bone maturation accelerates. As growth nears conclusion and attainment of adult height, bones begin to approach the size and shape of adult bones. The remaining cartilaginous portions of the epiphyses become thinner. As these cartilaginous zones become obliterated, the epiphyses are said to be "closed" and no further lengthening of the bones will occur. A small amount of spinal growth concludes an adolescent's growth.

The carpal bones arise from primary ossification centers and continue their calcification in an outward manner. The emergence of the primary ossification centers of the carpal bones appear in a predictable order that can help in determining bone age. First the capitate forms at an average age of 2 months, followed shortly by the hamate, then the triquetrum around 14 months, and so on.

== Automatic Bone Age Assessment ==
Different computer algorithms have been developed to estimate skeletal maturity from radiographs of the left hand and wrist. Automated approaches may be used to optimize human performance while reducing the burden on radiologists who interpret large numbers of studies. These computer based approaches can reduce subjectivity as well as inter- and intra-observer variability.
