= Nobody's Angel =

American girl group

- Origin: Los Angeles, California, U.S.
- Years active: 1998–2002
- Label: Hollywood Records
- Members: Alitzah "Ali" Navarro Wiener; Sarah Smith Podollan; Amy Sue Hardy; Stacey Harper Bell; Jennie Kwan; Tai-Amber Hoo

Nobody's Angel was an American girl group of the late 1990s and early 2000s. The group consisted of four members Alitzah Navarro, Stacey Harper, Amy Sue Hardy, and Sarah Smith, and later, Jennie Kwan and Tai-Amber Hoo as replacements when Harper and Hardy left the group. The band was put together after they became friends and discovered they had something in common: a shared taste for music, dancing, and acting.

== Biography ==
In 1998, the quartet recorded "Let's Get Together" for the movie The Parent Trap. A year later, the girls all guest-starred as fictionalized versions of themselves on the episode "Road Trip" from the ABC sitcom Boy Meets World, and soon after, in 2000, they released their self-titled album, on the Hollywood Records label. Nobody's Angel featured the hit song, "If You Wanna Dance". Later, they released the song "Pokémon World" with the boy band Youngstown for the movie Pokémon The Movie 2000.

They were featured in the ABC TV movie, Model Behavior, starring Justin Timberlake. Stacey and Amy Sue both left the group in 2001 to pursue careers of their own. They were soon replaced by actress-singer Jennie Kwan (formerly of the NBC show California Dreams) and Tai-Amber Hoo. Tai-Amber was a former member of another girl group called Gyrl before she joined Nobody's Angel. However, the group disbanded after the debut single was released.

After recording a few songs for the soundtracks to the Disney live-action films 102 Dalmatians (2000) and The Princess Diaries (2001), the group split up. An album was due to be released in 2002 but was shelved. The album did feature the singles "Whatcha Gonna Do (With Your Second Chance)?", "Always Tomorrow", and a remake of the Salt-N-Pepa song "Ain't Nuthin' But a She Thing" featuring Lil' J. Besides the songs from the soundtracks, No new music from their second album has been leaked.

In 2020, Sarah Christine Smith appeared as a guest on the Studio 60 on the Sunset Strip marathon fundraiser episode of The George Lucas Talk Show.

== Discography ==
Studio albums

- Nobody's Angel (February 1, 2000)

Singles

- "If You Wanna Dance" (November 23, 1999)
- "I Can't Help Myself" (2000) (Promo)

Soundtracks

- The Parent Trap Soundtrack – "Let's Get Together" (July 21, 1998)
- Pokémon The Movie 2000 Soundtrack – "Pokémon World" featuring Youngstown (July 18, 2000)
- 102 Dalmatians Soundtrack – "Whatcha Gonna Do (With Your Second Chance)?" (October 30, 2000)
- The Princess Diaries Soundtrack – "Ain't Nuthin' But a She Thing" featuring Lil J and "Always Tomorrow" (July 24, 2001)
- United States Of Avex Artists - "Movin' On" (March 7, 2001)

=== Unreleased second album ===
- Boyfriend In A Box (3:39)
- Come With Me (Remix) (3:45)
- Tell That To My Heart (3:55)
- Out Of My Life (3:27)
- Taboo (3:07)
- Connected (3:31)
- Found Somebody (4:28)
- Live My Life (3:32)
- I'd Like To Be (4:07)
- I'd Never Do That (3:10)
- Shy Girl (3:44)
- Get It Right This Time (2:53)
- Fight For Your Right To Party (2:59)
