= Constitutional growth delay =

Delayed puberty for some time

Constitutional delay of growth and puberty (CDGP) is a term describing a temporary delay in the skeletal growth and thus height of a child with no physical abnormalities causing the delay. Short stature may be the result of a growth pattern inherited from a parent (familial) or occur for no apparent reason (idiopathic). Typically at some point during childhood, growth slows down, eventually resuming at a normal rate. CDGP is the most common cause of short stature and delayed puberty.

== Synonyms ==
- Constitutional Delay of Growth and Adolescence (CDGA)
- Constitutional Growth Delay (CGD)

== See also ==
- Idiopathic short stature
- Failure to thrive
