= Tatton-Brown–Rahman syndrome =

Overgrowth syndrome caused by DNMT3A gene mutation

- Other names: DNMT3A overgrowth syndrome
- Specialty: Medical genetics
- Symptoms: Intellectual disability, overgrowth, facial dysmorphisms
- Usual onset: Present at birth
- Causes: DNMT3A mutation
- Diagnostic method: Molecular genetic testing
- Differential diagnosis: Cohen–Gibson syndrome, Fragile X syndrome, Malan syndrome, Simpson–Golabi–Behmel syndrome, Sotos syndrome, Weaver syndrome
- Treatment: Based on symptoms
- Frequency: 90 reported cases
- Named after: Nazneen Rahman

Tatton-Brown–Rahman syndrome (TBRS) is a rare overgrowth and intellectual disability syndrome caused by autosomal dominant mutations in the DNMT3A gene. The syndrome was first recognized in 2014 by Katrina Tatton-Brown, Nazneen Rahman, and collaborators.

== Signs and symptoms ==
TBRS is defined by overgrowth and mild-to-severe intellectual disability. All individuals with TBRS experience some degree of developmental delay and/or intellectual disability, with 86% of well-documented cases falling in the mild to moderate range. Most individuals with TBRS exhibit increased stature, head circumference, and weight at least two standard deviations above the mean.

Generalized joint hypermobility and hypotonia are observed in ~75% and ~55% of cases, respectively, and are often associated with musculoskeletal pain and joint instability. Approximately half of individuals exhibit behavioral or psychiatric issues; the most common diagnosis is autism spectrum disorder. Febrile seizures and afebrile seizures have been reported in ~20% of individuals with TBRS.

The facial gestalt of TBRS includes a round face; thick, horizontal, low-set eyebrows; vertically narrow palpebral fissures; and prominent maxillary central incisors. These features often become most clinically recognizable in adolescence.

Congenital heart defects and aortic root dilatation have been observed in ~10% of cases. Approximately 20% of males with TBRS have cryptorchidism. Vesicoureteral reflux and hypospadias have been reported in some cases.

Neuroimaging findings may include corpus callosum anomalies, small posterior cranial fossa, asymmetric arcuate and uncinate fasciculi, deep left Sylvian fissure, and increased cortical thickness

== Cause ==
TBRS is caused by autosomal dominant mutations in the DNMT3A gene. Nearly all cases are caused by de novo mutations; rarely, a pathogenic variant can be inherited from an affected parent or an unaffected mosaic parent. DNMT3A overgrowth mutations are hypothesized to interfere with the enzyme's role in H3K36me2-regulated non-CpG DNA methylation.

== Management and prognosis ==
The majority of individuals with TBRS are in good health. An individual's specific features are treated and managed as indicated. Early childhood intervention and special education (IFSP and IEP in the United States) are recommended.

Because DNMT3A mutations are commonly observed in acute myeloid leukemia, TBRS may be associated with increased cancer risk.

== See also ==
- Overgrowth syndrome
- Sotos syndrome
- Weaver syndrome
