= Nevo syndrome =

- Other names: Cerebral gigantism, Nevo type
- Nevo syndrome is inherited in an autosomal recessive manner.

Nevo syndrome is a rare autosomal recessive disorder that usually begins during the later stages of pregnancy. Nevo syndrome is caused by a NSD1 deletion, which encodes for methyltransferase involved with chromatin regulation. The exact mechanism as to how the chromatin is changed is unknown and still being studied. Nevo syndrome is an example of one of about twelve overgrowth syndromes known today. Overgrowth syndromes are characterized with children experiencing a significant overgrowth during pregnancy and also excessive postnatal growth. Studies concerning Nevo syndrome have shown a similar relation to Ehlers–Danlos syndrome, a connective tissue disorder. Nevo syndrome is associated with kyphosis, an abnormal increased forward rounding of the spine, joint laxity, postpartum overgrowth, a highly arched palate, undescended testes in males, low-set ears, increased head circumference, among other symptoms.

== Signs and symptoms ==
One of the most prominent and visible symptoms of Nevo syndrome is the prenatal overgrowth, which continues into the infant and toddler stage. This excessive weight gain can be attributed to the low concentrations of growth hormone and insulin growth factor that are normally present to regulate weight gain. Other common symptoms associated with Nevo syndrome are the outward wrist-drop, edema in hands and feet, undescended testes, low-set ears, hypotonia, the presence of low muscle tone in children, and long tapered fingers, and a highly arched palate.

== Diagnosis ==
Nevo syndrome is an autosomal recessive disorder. Most times in which a child is afflicted with Nevo syndrome, both their parents are of average height and weight. It is only until after birth when the characteristic physical traits associated with disease are manifested, and the disorder is actually diagnosed. One study showed that despite the increased growth rates, the patient was completely healthy up until age 6, when he was admitted into the hospital. Nevo syndrome is usually associated with early childhood fatality. Children with Nevo syndrome have a high occurrence of death due to cardiac arrest because their developing hearts cannot keep up with their overgrown body.

== History ==
Nevo syndrome is considered to be a rare disorder. Since its first description in 1974, only a handful of cases have been reported. Studies have shown showing similarities between Nevo syndrome with Ehlers-Danlos syndrome as well as Sotos syndrome. There is an astounding overlap of phenotypic manifestations between Nevo syndrome and the more frequent Sotos syndrome, which are both caused by the NSD1 deletion. Sotos syndrome is an autosomal dominant condition associated with learning disabilities, a distinctive facial appearance, and overgrowth. Studies have shown an overwhelming occurrence (half of those involved in the study) of Nevo syndrome in those individuals of Middle-Eastern descent.
