= Perlman syndrome =

Overgrowth syndrome caused by DIS3L2 gene mutation

- Other names: Nephroblastomatosis-fetal ascites-macrosomia-Wilms tumor syndrome
- Specialty: Medical genetics, pediatric oncology
- Symptoms: Overgrowth, kidney dysplasia, facial dysmorphisms
- Complications: Wilms' tumor
- Usual onset: Prenatal or at birth
- Duration: Lifelong
- Causes: DIS3L2 mutation
- Differential diagnosis: Beckwith–Wiedemann syndrome, Simpson–Golabi–Behmel syndrome
- Prognosis: High neonatal mortality
- Frequency: 30 reported cases
- Named after: Max Perlman

Perlman syndrome (PS), also known as nephroblastomatosis-fetal ascites-macrosomia-Wilms tumor syndrome, is a rare overgrowth syndrome caused by autosomal recessive mutations in the DIS3L2 gene. PS is characterized by macrocephaly, neonatal macrosomia, nephromegaly, renal dysplasia, dysmorphic facial features, and increased risk for Wilms' tumor. The syndrome is associated with high neonatal mortality.

== Signs and symptoms ==
Perlman syndrome may be detected as early as gestational week 18 by prenatal ultrasound. In the first trimester, cystic hygroma and thickened nuchal translucency may be observed. Macrosomia, macrocephaly, enlarged kidneys, macroglossia, cardiac abnormalities, and visceromegaly may become evident by the second and third trimesters. Polyhydramnios is frequently observed.

Characteristic facial features of Perlman syndrome include a hypotonic appearance with an open mouth, macrocephaly, upsweeping anterior scalp line, deep-set eyes, depressed nasal bridge, everted upper lip, and mild micrognathia.

Diagnosis is made based on the individual's phenotypic features and confirmed by histologic examination of the kidneys and/or molecular genetic testing. Bilateral kidney hamartomas with or without nephroblastomatosis are commonly observed.

== Genetics ==
Perlman syndrome is caused by mutations in the DIS3L2 gene found on chromosome 2 at 2q37.2. DIS3L2 is involved in RNA degradation and cell cycle control. PS is genetically distinct from Beckwith–Wiedemann syndrome and Simpson–Golabi–Behmel syndrome, which are caused by mutations in 11p15.5 and GPC3 respectively. It is inherited in an autosomal recessive manner.

== Management and prognosis ==
Perlman syndrome is associated with a high neonatal death rate due to renal failure and/or refractory hypoxemia. Most individuals who survive beyond the neonatal period develop a Wilms' tumor; nearly all display some degree of developmental delay. Treatment is supportive in nature.

== Epidemiology ==
Perlman syndrome is a rare disease with an estimated incidence of less than 1 in 1,000,000. As of 2008, fewer than 30 patients had ever been reported in the world literature. PS has been described in both consanguineous and non-consanguineous couplings. The observed sex ratio is 2 males : 1 female.

== See also ==
- Beckwith–Wiedemann syndrome
- Simpson–Golabi–Behmel syndrome
- Multiple abnormalities
- Overgrowth syndrome
- Wilms' tumor
