= Marshall–Smith syndrome =

Marshall-Smith syndrome
- Other names: Greig's syndrome, Polysyndactyly cephalopolysyndactyly syndrome, Accelerated skeletal maturation, Marshall-Smith type, Marshall–Smith–Weaver syndrome

Marshall-Smith syndrome, discovered in 1971 (Marshall, Graham, Scott, Boner, & Smith), is characterized by unusual accelerated skeletal maturation (usually starting before birth) and symptoms like conspicuous physical characteristics, respiratory difficulties, and intellectual disability. Cases described in the literature show a clinical variability regarding related symptoms. For instance, respiratory difficulties are ranging from absent to severe difficulties.

== Presentation ==
The syndrome is a rare clinical disorder.

- Physical
  - Overgrowth
  - Accelerated skeletal maturation
  - Dysmorphic facial features
    - Prominent eyes
    - Bluish sclerae
    - Coarse eyebrows
    - Upturned nose
- Radiologic examination
  - Accelerated osseous maturation
  - Phalangeal abnormalities
  - Tubular thinning of the long bones
  - Skull abnormalities
- Mental
  - Often associated with intellectual disability (of variable degree)

== Genotype ==
The first gene - NFIX - that could cause the syndrome has been identified. This gene is located on the short arm of chromosome 19 (19p13.1).

== Diagnosis ==
- Clinical course
  - Respiratory difficulties (like upper airway obstruction. (Note regarding clinical variability: respiratory difficulties might be absent.)
  - Pneumonia
  - Failure to thrive
  - Psychomotor retardation

Respiratory complications are often cause of death in early infancy.

=== Differential diagnosis ===
Marshall–Smith syndrome is not to be confused with:

- Marshall syndrome
- Malan syndrome
- Weaver syndrome (WSS)

== Terminology ==
=== Translated ===
- English: Marshall–Smith syndrome
- Español: Síndrome de Marshall–Smith
- Français: Le syndrome de Marshall–Smith
- Italiano: Sindrome di Marshall–Smith
- Nederlands: Marshall–Smithsyndroom, syndroom van Marshall–Smith
- Polski: Zespół Marshalla–Smitha, Zespół Marshalla i Smitha
- Русский: Синдром Маршалла–Смита
