= NAP1L4 =

Protein-coding gene in the species Homo sapiens

Identifiers
- Aliases: NAP1L4, NAP1L4b, NAP2, NAP2L, hNAP2, nucleosome assembly protein 1 like 4
- External IDs: OMIM: 601651; MGI: 1316687; GeneCards: NAP1L4

Gene location (Human)
| Chr. | Chromosome 11 (human) |
| Band | 11p15.4 | Start | 2,944,431 bp |
| Band | 11p15.4 | End | 2,992,377 bp |

Gene location (Mouse)
| Chr. | Chromosome 7 (mouse) |
| Band | 7 F5|7 88.24 cM | Start | 143,513,579 bp |
| Band | 7 F5|7 88.24 cM | End | 143,549,106 bp |
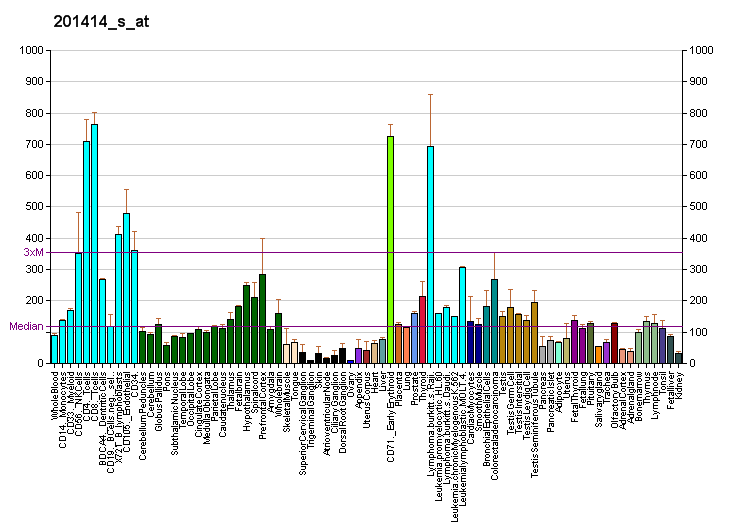
RNA expression pattern
| Bgee | Human / Mouse (ortholog); Top expressed in: ventricular zone; ganglionic eminence; C1 segment; Achilles tendon; left testis; right testis; bone marrow cell; sural nerve; apex of heart; epithelium of colon / Top expressed in: saccule; ectoderm; otic placode; otic vesicle; lens; epithelium of lens; medullary collecting duct; superior cervical ganglion; ventricular zone; primitive streak; More reference expression data |
| BioGPS | More reference expression data |
Gene ontology
| Molecular function | unfolded protein binding; protein binding; RNA binding; nucleosome binding |
| Cellular component | nucleus; cytoplasm |
| Biological process | nucleosome assembly |
Sources:Amigo / QuickGO
Orthologs
| Databases | NCBI: entry; OMA: entry |
| Species | Human | Mouse |
| Entrez | 4676 | 17955 |
| Ensembl | ENSG00000205531; ENSG00000273562 | ENSMUSG00000059119 |
| UniProt | Q99733 | Q78ZA7 |
| RefSeq (mRNA) | NM_005969 | NM_001285489; NM_001285490; NM_008672 |
| RefSeq (protein) | NP_005960; NP_001356304; NP_001356305; NP_001356306; NP_001356307 NP_001356308; NP_001356309; NP_001356310; NP_001356311; NP_001356312; NP_001356313; NP_001356314; NP_001356315; NP_001356317; NP_005960.1 | NP_001272418; NP_001272419; NP_032698 |
| Location (UCSC) | Chr 11: 2.94 – 2.99 Mb | Chr 7: 143.51 – 143.55 Mb |
| PubMed search |
- Wikidata
| View/Edit Human | View/Edit Mouse |

Nucleosome assembly protein 1-like 4 is a protein that in humans is encoded by the NAP1L4 gene.

This gene encodes a member of the nucleosome assembly protein (NAP) family which can interact with both core and linker histones. It can shuttle between the cytoplasm and nucleus, suggesting a role as a histone chaperone. This gene is one of several located near the imprinted gene domain of 11p15.5, an important tumor-suppressor gene region. Alterations in this region have been associated with the Beckwith-Wiedemann syndrome, Wilms tumor, rhabdomyosarcoma, adrenocortical carcinoma, and lung, ovarian, and breast cancer.
