= Nadir Al Zoghbi =

Syrian writer

- Born: Nadir Al Zoghbi
- Occupations: Writer; novelist; poet
- Years active: 2010–present
- Notable work: Euro; Abeel
- Style: Novels, Short story collections

Nadir Al Zoghbi (Arabic: ندير الزعبي) is a Syrian novelist, poet, and writer. He has authored several novels and short story collections. His first published work appeared in 2012. His works include the novels Ten Nights and a Night, Euro, and Abeel, and the short story collections 32 Fahrenheit and Ghosts of Pictures.

== Career ==
Al Zoghbi's literary debut was in 2012. His novel Ten Nights and a Night, published by Arab Scientific Publishers in 2014, features a narrator who journeys through time and space.

In 2015, he published the short story collection 32 Fahrenheit. The stories in the collection include "The Sink", "Light", "Coffee Cup", "Box", "Matchstick", "Poetry’s Tongue", "Solo", "Fur", "Polar Bear and Refrigerator", "Chatter", "First Bullet", "Bouchard", "Last Call", "Sound of Silence", "Peace", "Not a Pipe", "Abracadabra", "Kisdor", "Squirrel and Cherries", and the titular story, "32 Fahrenheit". His second collection of short stories, Ghosts of Pictures, was also published in 2015 by Fadaat, followed by the novel Euro, published by Arab Scientific Publishers.

His novel Abeel, published on March 15, 2019, by the House of Culture for Publishing and Distribution, narrates the story of a man afflicted with pituitary gigantism.

== Works ==
- Euro
- Ten Nights and a Night
- Ghosts of Pictures
- 32 Fahrenheit
- Abeel
