= Simpson–Golabi–Behmel syndrome =

Congenital disorder

- Other names: Sara Agers syndrome, Golabi–Rosen syndrome, Simpson dysmorphia syndrome (SDYS) or X-linked dysplasia gigantism syndrome (DGSX)
- Simpson–Golabi–Behmel syndrome has an X-linked recessive pattern of inheritance.
- Specialty: Medical genetics
- Causes: Genetic

Simpson–Golabi–Behmel syndrome (SGBS) is a rare inherited congenital disorder that can cause craniofacial, skeletal, vascular, cardiac, and renal abnormalities. There is a high prevalence of cancer associated in those with SGBS which includes Wilms tumors, neuroblastoma, tumors of the adrenal gland, liver, lungs and abdominal organs. The syndrome is inherited in an X-linked recessive manner. Females that possess one copy of the mutation are considered to be carriers of the syndrome but may still express varying degrees of the phenotype, suffering mild to severe malady. Males experience a higher likelihood of fetal death.

== Types ==
There are two types of SGBS, each associated with mutations on a different gene:

Type	OMIM	Gene	Locus
SGBS1	312870	GPC3	Xq26
SGBS2	300209	OFD1	Xp22

SGBS is also considered to be an overgrowth syndrome (OGS). OGS is characterized by a two to three standard deviation increase in weight, height, or head circumference above the average for sex and age. One of the most noted features of OGS is the increased risk of neoplasms in certain OGSs. SGBS in particular has been found to have a 10% tumor predisposition frequency with 94% of cases occurring in the abdominal region, most being malignant. It is common for tumors to be embryonal in type and appear before the age of 10. There are five different types of tumors that patients with SGBS might develop, all intra-abdominal: Wilms tumor, hepatoblastoma, hepatocarcinoma, gonadoblastoma, and neuroblastoma. The most common types of tumors developed in patients are the Wilms tumor and hepatoblastoma.

== Symptoms and signs ==
May include one or more of the following symptons:

- Macrosomia
- Macroglossia
- Advanced bone age
- Organomegaly is especially noted in liver and spleen
- malformations of the kidneys (which may result in sporadic hypokalemia)
- gastrointestinal and malabsorption disorders
- muscle weakness
- bone pain
- Neonatal hypoglycemia
- Neoplasms
- Congenital diaphragmatic hernia
- (wide or protruding jaw and tongue, widened nasal bridge, upturned nasal tip) most commonly observed in males or elongated head and face shape, and narrow chin with overbite, underjet has been noted in females as well
- palate abnormalities
- malocclusion of teeth
- bow shaped, with narrower top lip
- emphasized center line on the tongue
- Most often, Hands and feet are short and broad with dysplastic nails, but marfan-like elongated spindle fingers and elongated, narrow feet and elongated toes have also been present in those with SGBS
- Cutaneous syndactyly
- Polydactyly
- Pectus excavatum
- Talipes
- Vertebral segmentation defects
- extra lumbar vertebrate
- defects of the chambers of the lungs
- presence of rotated large intestine
- hernia of the diaphragm
- extra ribs may be present
- Supernumerary nipples
- Structural and conductive cardiac defects
- Multicystic dysplastic kidneys
- Hypotonia
- Seizures
- Brain malformations
- Developmental disabilities
- Intellectual disability- can be inexistent or mild to severe
- increased anxiety
- increased likelihood of cancers including lung cancers, wilms tumors (kidney and brain), hepatic carcinomas, neuroblastoma and cancer of the adrenal gland. 90 percent of currently manifested tumors have been found to be localized to the abdominal regions with the majority of those being both wilms and neuroblastoma, then adrenal cancers

== Causes ==
Although not all causes of SGBS have been identified, one cause of SGBS type I is a mutation of the glypican-3 gene (GPC3) on the X chromosome locus q26.1. This particular gene is widely expressed, especially in tissues derived from the mesoderm during fetal development. The function of this gene is to produce a protein that acts as a cell surface receptor that binds to transcription factors. Binding of the transcription factors allows regulation of cellular responses to growth factors such as members of the hedgehog protein family. When large or small deletions and missense mutations occur along the GPC3 gene, GPC3 can no longer negatively regulate Hedgehog signaling during development, therefore increasing cell proliferation and the risk of developing cancer. Limb patterning and skeletal development may also go awry when GPC3 mutations inhibit regulations of responses to bone morphogenetic proteins, another type of growth factor.

It has been suggested that SGBS type II may be caused by duplication of the GPC4 gene, which helps to regulate cell division and growth.

Also, some patients diagnosed with SGBS do not have any GPC3 or GPC4 deletions or mutations. Possible explanations include promoter mutation or silencing of the GPC3 gene causing reduced expression in these patients.

== Genetics ==
The disorder is passed on in an X-linked recessive fashion.

== Diagnosis ==
Detection usually begins with a routine doctor visit when the fundal height is being measured or during an ultrasound examination. When large for gestational age fetuses (LGA) are identified, there are two common causes: maternal diabetes or incorrect dates. However, if these two causes can be ruled out, an ultrasound is performed to detect for overgrowth and other abnormalities. At this point, it becomes essential for a clinical geneticist to assist in the correct selection of tests and possible diagnosis.

First signs of SGBS may be observed as early as 16 weeks of gestation. Aids to diagnosing might include the presence of macrosomia, polyhydramnios, elevated maternal serum-α-fetoprotein, cystic hygroma, hydrops fetalis, increased nuchal translucency, craniofacial abnormalities, visceromegaly, renal abnormalities, congenital diaphragmatic hernia, polydactyly, and a single umbilical artery.

If there is a known mutation in the family, prenatal testing is available. Prenatal testing is also possible by looking for evidence of SGBS phenotype in the mother and the positive SGBS phenotype in male family members. Family members who have SGBS may undergo mutational analysis of genes GPC3, GPC4, and CXORF5. Genomic balance in Xp22 and Xq26 may also be analyzed through array comparative genomic hybridization. Evaluation by a medical geneticist is recommended for those strong indications or likelihood of SGBS and for immediate relatives of those genetically confirmed to have SGBS.

Due to the high percentage of male deaths during the neonatal period, early detection of tumors is crucial. In order to detect the presence of tumors, screening in SGBS patients should include abdominal ultrasound, urinalysis, and biochemical markers that screen for embryonic tumors.

PET scan with CT is recommended for accurate diagnostic procedure in adult SGBS patients who have manifested tumors and or cysts, especially those of the kidneys, lungs, and or patients which express atypical lesion of the liver or who may be suspect for neuroblastoma.

Once the infant is born, possibility of hypoglycemia must be assessed along with cardiac, genitalia, liver, and adrenal evaluations. Such tests include chest radiographs, electrocardiogram, echocardiogram, renal sonography, and abdominal sonography and CT to test for possible abnormalities.

== Treatment ==
Since the syndrome is caused by a genetic mutation in the individual's DNA, a cure is not available. Treatment of the symptoms and management of the syndrome, however, is possible.

Due to the likelihood of patients developing tumors, full body CT scans are a recommended diagnostic tool. As there have been cases in which the genetic mutation is accompanied by further genetic presence of the bard 1 gene and presence of triple negative cancers, those with such dual expressions cannot rely upon standardized biopy for determination of cancer, but should resort to further diagnostic tools (i.e. those such as pet scans which measure chemical and decay rate factors for diagnosis).

Depending on the manifestation, surgery, special dietary consideration in the event of gastrointestinal affectations, special education, occupational therapy, speech therapy, and physical therapy are some methods of managing the syndrome and associated symptoms.

== Research ==
SGBS is similar to another overgrowth syndrome called Beckwith–Wiedemann syndrome.

SGBS Cells are a unique tool to study the function of Human adipocyte biology. These cells are similar to human primary preadipocytes, and may or may not become a popular model instead of Mouse 3T3-L1 cells to study the secretion and adipokine profile in the future. This cellular tool has been described and developed by Dr. Martin Wabitsch, University of Ulm, Germany.
