= Nephromegaly =

Abnormally enlarged kidneys

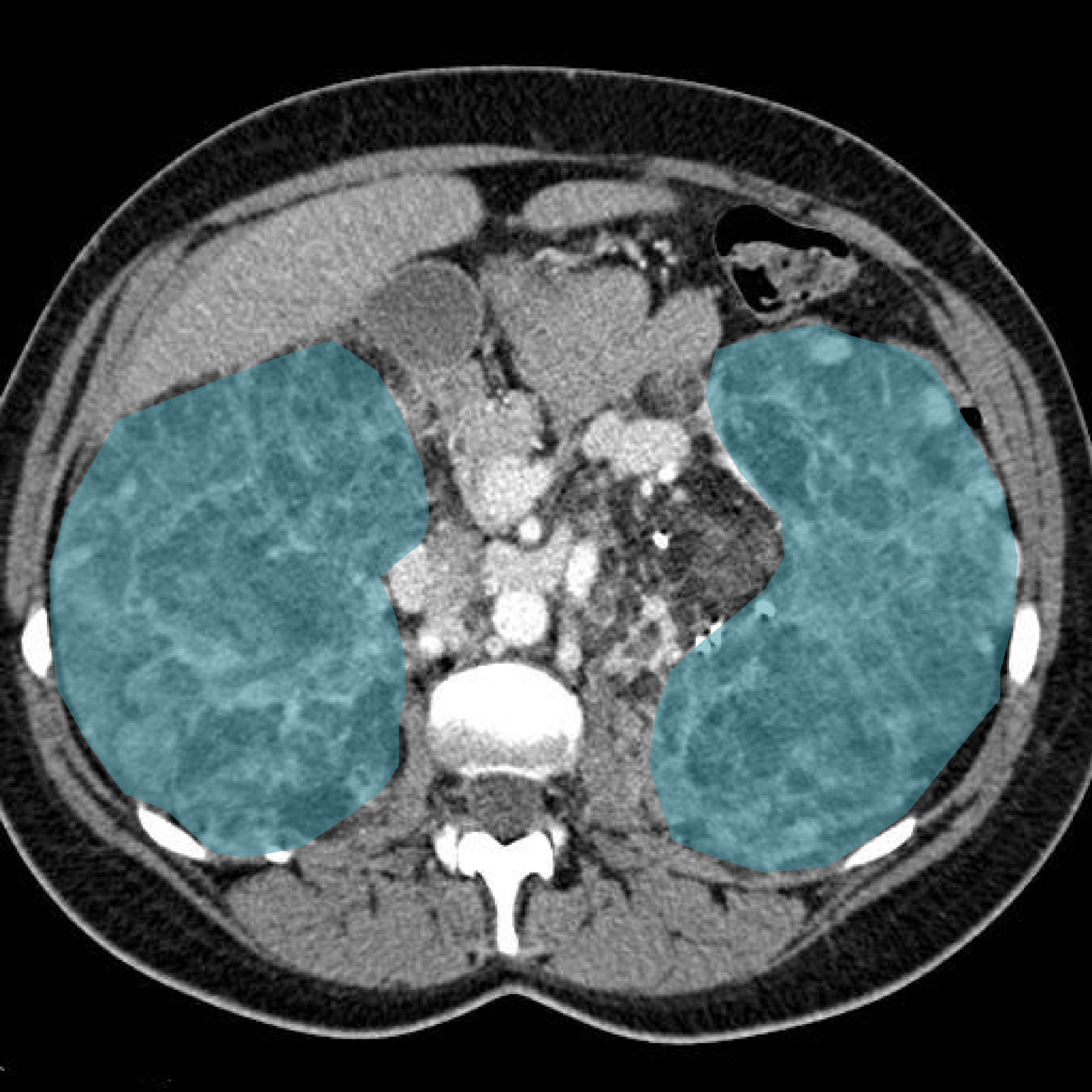
- Enlarged kidneys in blue
- Specialty: Nephrology

Nephromegaly is the process whereby one or both kidneys become enlarged. It is defined as an enlargement of more than two standard deviations above the mean for age and body size of a particular individual. It can be caused by a variety of conditions including infiltrative disorders, metabolic conditions, cysts, and other diseases.

== History ==
While the condition was not discovered by a single individual, English physician Richard Bright (1789–1858) developed an interest in the kidney diseases, which would lead to his 1827 Reports of such medical cases.

== Definition ==
Nephromegaly is the process whereby one or both kidneys become enlarged. It is defined as an enlargement of more than two standard deviations above the mean for age and body size of a particular individual. In adults, as the normal kidney length is typically 10–12 cm (3.9–4.7 in), lengths above 13 cm (5.1 in) suggest a general enlargement.

== Causes ==
In adults, it can be caused by infiltrative hematologic diseases such as leukemia or mantle-cell lymphoma, which can invade both kidneys, causing marked enlargement. It can be caused by cysts due to polycystic kidney disease, and diabetic nephropathy. Acquired cystic disease and renal inflammation can lead to enlargement. It can also be caused due to rare systemic conditions such as Kawasaki disease, and propionic acidemia.

In children, it can be caused due to acute febrile urinary tract infections, which cause temporary kidney enlargement. The enlargement leads to later renal scarring. In infants, it can be a result of renal lymphangioma or an indication of Beckwith-Wiedemann syndrome.

== Diagnosis ==
A pelvic ultrasonography is used for visualizing the kidneys, and detecting their size, structure, and presence of edema, and cysts. Further imaging such as Computer Tomography, Magnetic Resonance Imaging, and PET-CT can assess masses and structural anomalies. Blood tests and biopsies may be required for further analysis.

== Treatment ==
The treatment plan depends on the underlying cause. In case of acute nephritis, antibiotics are used. For urological obstruction, urgent urinary decompression is advised, often accompanied by pharmacological intervention. For chronic diseases such as polycystic or chronic kidney diseases, the treatment involves a combination of drugs to treat infections, control hypertension, diuretics, and regulation fluid and salt intakes. For infiltrative diseases, from leukemia/lymphoma it requires systemic treatment such as chemotherapy.
