= Malan syndrome =

Overgrowth syndrome caused by NFIX gene mutation

- Other names: Malan overgrowth syndrome, MALNS, Sotos-like syndrome, Sotos syndrome 2
- Specialty: Medical genetics
- Symptoms: Intellectual disability, overgrowth, Marfanoid habitus, visual problems
- Usual onset: Present at birth
- Causes: NFIX mutation
- Diagnostic method: Molecular genetic testing
- Differential diagnosis: Marfan syndrome, Sotos syndrome, Weaver syndrome
- Management: Based on symptoms
- Frequency: 80 reported cases
- Named after: Valérie Malan

Malan syndrome (MALNS) is a rare overgrowth syndrome caused by autosomal dominant mutations in the NFIX gene. The syndrome is characterized by overgrowth, craniofacial dysmorphia, intellectual disability, and behavioral issues. It was formerly diagnosed as Sotos syndrome 2.

== Signs and symptoms ==
Malan syndrome is defined by initial overgrowth and mild-to-severe intellectual disability. Almost all individuals with Malan syndrome display above-average height, weight, and head circumference in early life, but only one-third of adults with Malan syndrome are >2 standard deviations above the mean. Most individuals display advanced bone age. Hypotonia and seizures may be observed.

All individuals display some degree of global developmental delay and intellectual disability which typically ranges from moderate to severe, though mild cases have been observed. Cognitive function, adaptive function, and language skills are impaired. Anxiety and noise hypersensitivity are frequently reported. Autism spectrum features are observed in 31% of individuals.

The facial gestalt of Malan syndrome includes dolichocephaly, a long or triangular face, prominent forehead, depressed nasal bridge, deep-set eyes, downslanting palpebral fissures, short nose with anteverted nares, long philtrum, everted lower lip, and prominent chin. Marfanoid features are extremely common, including scoliosis, hyperkyphosis or hyperlordosis, pectus excavatum or carinatum, slender habitus, and long hands.

Ophthalmological features are common in Malan syndrome and can be used to distinguish it from Sotos syndrome. Vision impairments may include strabismus, myopia, hypermetropia, astigmatism, and nystagmus. Blue sclerae are often observed.

== Cause ==
Malan syndrome is caused by autosomal dominant mutations in the NFIX gene. Both variants and deletions have been reported. In some cases, the deletion also affects CACNA1A, which is associated with episodic ataxia type 2 or familial hemiplegic migraine. Nearly all cases are caused by de novo mutations, though familial cases have been observed due to gonadal or parental mosaicism.

== Management ==
Individuals with Malan syndrome should receive comprehensive evaluation of all major body systems at diagnosis. Height, weight, head circumference, BMI, and food intake should be evaluated regularly. Orthopedic and visual evaluations are recommended annually until puberty. Risk of pathologic bone fracture is increased in Malan syndrome; bone integrity can be assessed via DXA. Neurological features such as epilepsy and vegetative symptoms should receive standard treatment. Neuropsychiatric and behavioral issues should be evaluated at diagnosis and managed as appropriate.

== See also ==
- Overgrowth syndrome
- Marfan syndrome
- Sotos syndrome
- Weaver syndrome
