= Nazneen Rahman =

Geneticist and singer-songwriter

Nazneen Rahman CBE FMedSci
- Education: University of Oxford (BM BCh); University of London (PhD)
- Scientific career
- Thesis: Localisation and characterisation of the familial tumour gene, FWT1 (1999)
- Doctoral advisor: Michael Stratton
- Website: icr.ac.uk/our-research/researchers-and-teams/professor-nazneen-rahman

Sabera Nazneen Rahman CBE FMedSci is a geneticist who specialises in cancer research. She was previously head of Genetics and Epidemiology at the Institute of Cancer Research. She resigned from this role 2018 after more than 45 current and former colleagues at the Institute of Cancer Research submitted formal complaints alleging bullying and a toxic workplace culture under Rahman’s leadership. An independent investigation upheld many of the allegations, leading to her resignation and the revocation of £3.5 million in Wellcome Trust funding. The case was widely seen as a landmark moment in UK academia, as it constituted one of the first public examples of a major research funder taking direct action against a PI for workplace culture violations. She resigned from the post before disciplinary action could be taken, which raised concerns among former colleagues about the lack of accountability in such cases, with some warning that it allows those accused of misconduct to potentially return to senior roles or funding without formal consequences. Rahman currently works as a non-executive director at Astra Zeneca, where she chairs the Science and Sustainability Committees and as the director of the Sustainable Medicine Partnership.

== Education ==
Rahman qualified in medicine from University of Oxford in 1991, and completed a PhD in Molecular Genetics in 1999 on the Wilms' tumor susceptibility gene FWT1. She completed her Certificate of Completion of Specialist Training in Clinical Genetics in 2001.

== Career and research ==
She was head of Genetics and Epidemiology at the Institute of Cancer Research, based at the Sir Richard Doll Building in Sutton. She specialises in research into the genetic mechanisms that cause cancer, particularly among groups with a predisposition to pediatric cancers or breast cancer. Through her research, Professor Rahman has provided improved screening and treatment options for NHS patients, and also provides advice on rare cancer genetics to clinicians internationally. She blogs about her work at Harvesting the Genome.

Rahman held a clinical role as head of the cancer genetics service at The Royal Marsden and St George's Hospital in south west London.

Rahman resigned from her position following in October 2018 following upholding on independent investigation of a complaint of systematic bullying spanning 15 years from 44 of her current and former staff and students . Rahman also lost a £3.5-million grant from the Wellcome Trust.

In 2017 Rahman was appointed Non-Executive Director and member of the Science Committee at AstraZeneca Plc.

== Awards and honours ==
Rahman was elected a Fellow of the Academy of Medical Sciences in 2010. Her nomination reads:

Nazneen Rahman is Professor of Human Genetics at the Institute of Cancer Research and Head of the Clinical Genetics Department at the Royal Marsden Hospital. Her research work has been directed towards the mapping, identification and clinical characterisation of human disease genes using genome-wide linkage analysis, positional cloning, candidate gene resequencing, genome-wide association analyses and epigenetic assays. Her primary areas of research are breast cancer susceptibility, childhood cancer susceptibility and human growth disorders. In her relatively short career to date she has already identified and characterised 4 breast cancer predisposition genes and two childhood cancer predisposition genes and two overgrowth genes.

In April 2014, she was named as Britain's third most influential woman in the BBC Woman's Hour power list 2014. In February 2016, she was awarded the Services to Science & Engineering award at the British Muslim Awards.

She was appointed Commander of the Order of the British Empire (CBE) in the 2016 Birthday Honours for services to medical science.

== Personal life ==
Rahman is also a singer-songwriter, with two albums and one EP released. She reached the final of the UK Songwriting Competition 2019 in the singer-songwriter category with the song "Ain’t No Love Like This".

== See also ==
- British Bangladeshi
- List of British Bangladeshis
- Category:British geneticists
- Category:Women geneticists
