= Macroglossia =

Enlargement of the tongue

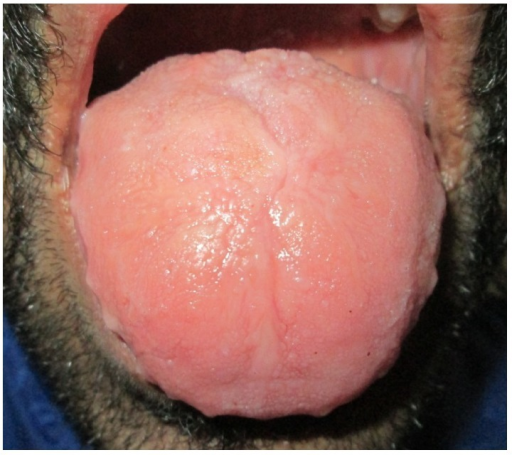
- Macroglossia with crenations along the margins and loss of papillae on dorsum surface of the tongue.
- Specialty: Medical genetics

Macroglossia is the medical term for an unusually large tongue. Severe enlargement of the tongue can cause cosmetic and functional difficulties in speaking, eating, swallowing and sleeping. Macroglossia is uncommon, and usually occurs in children. There are many causes. Treatment depends upon the exact cause.

== Signs and symptoms ==
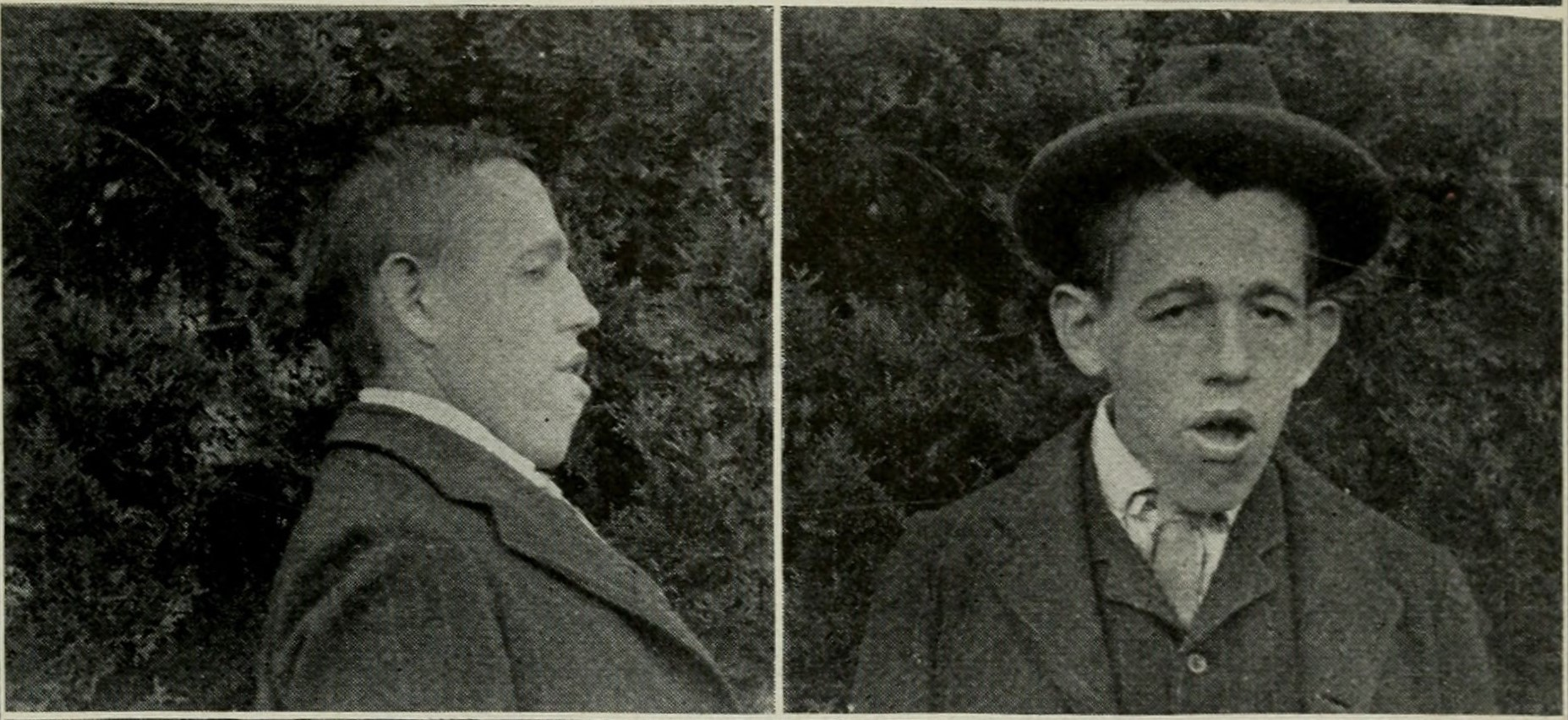
Macroglossia with prognathism and open resting mouth position

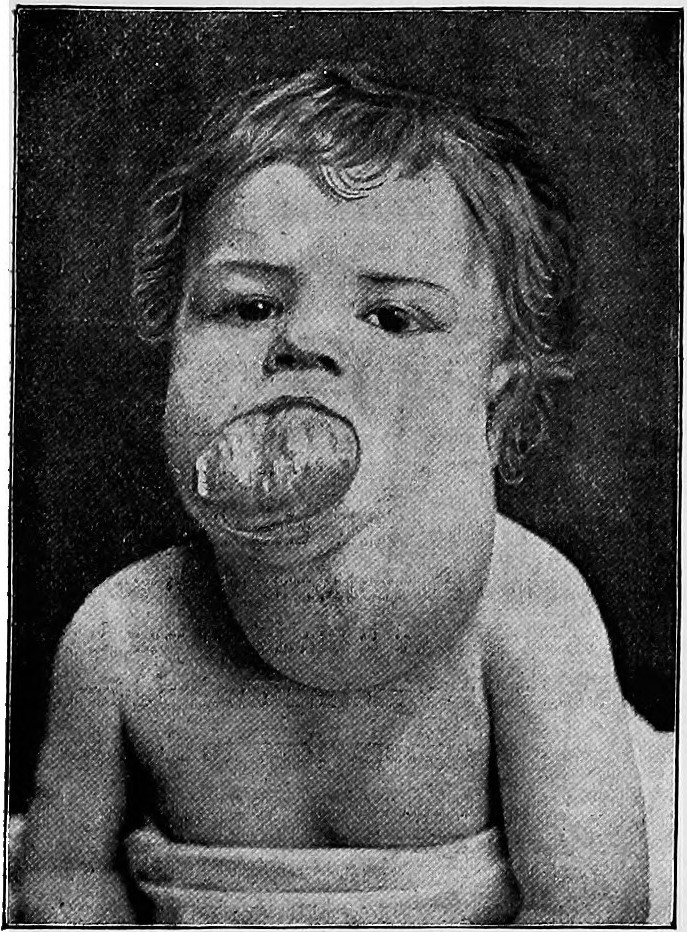
Severe macroglossia

Although it may be asymptomatic, symptoms usually are more likely to be present and more severe with larger tongue enlargements. Signs and symptoms include:

- Dyspnea – difficult, noisy breathing, obstructive sleep apnea or airway obstruction
- Dysphagia – difficulty swallowing and eating
- Dysphonia – disrupted speech, possibly manifest as lisping
- Sialorrhea – drooling
- Angular cheilitis – sores at the corners of the mouth
- Crenated tongue – indentations on the lateral borders of the tongue caused by pressure from teeth ("pie crust tongue")
- Open bite malocclusion – a type of malocclusion of the teeth
- Mandibular prognathism – enlarged mandible
- Mouth breathing
- Orthodontic abnormalities – including diastema and tooth spacing

A tongue that constantly protrudes from the mouth is vulnerable to drying out, ulceration, infection or even necrosis.

== Causes ==
Macroglossia may be caused by a wide variety of congenital and acquired conditions. Isolated macroglossia has no determinable cause. The most common causes of tongue enlargement are vascular malformations (e.g. lymphangioma or hemangioma) and muscular hypertrophy (e.g. Beckwith–Wiedemann syndrome or hemihyperplasia). Enlargement due to lymphangioma gives the tongue a pebbly appearance with multiple superficial dilated lymphatic channels. Enlargement due to hemihyperplasia is unilateral. In edentulous persons, a lack of teeth leaves more room for the tongue to expand into laterally, which can create problems with wearing dentures and may cause pseudomacroglossia.

Amyloidosis is an accumulation of insoluble proteins in tissues that impedes normal function. This can be a cause of macroglossia if amyloid is deposited in the tissues of the tongue, which gives it a nodular appearance. Beckwith–Wiedemann syndrome is a rare hereditary condition, which may include other defects such as omphalocele, visceromegaly, gigantism or neonatal hypoglycemia. The tongue may show a diffuse, smooth generalized enlargement. The face may show maxillary hypoplasia causing relative mandibular prognathism. Apparent macroglossia can also occur in Down syndrome. The tongue has a papillary, fissured surface. Macroglossia may be a sign of hypothyroid disorders.

Other causes include mucopolysaccharidosis, neurofibromatosis, multiple endocrine neoplasia type 2B, myxedema, acromegaly, angioedema, tumors (e.g. carcinoma), Glycogen storage disease type 2, Simpson–Golabi–Behmel syndrome, Triploid syndrome, trisomy 4p, fucosidosis, alpha-mannosidosis, Klippel–Trénaunay syndrome, cardiofaciocutaneous syndrome, Ras pathway disorders, transient neonatal diabetes, and lingual thyroid.

== Diagnosis ==
Macroglossia is usually diagnosed clinically. Sleep endoscopy and imaging may be used for assessment of obstructive sleep apnea. The initial evaluation of all patients with macroglossia may involve abdominal ultrasound and molecular studies for Beckwith–Wiedemann syndrome.

=== Classification ===
The ICD-10 lists macroglossia under "other congenital malformations of the digestive system". Definitions of macroglossia have been proposed, including "a tongue that protrudes beyond the teeth during [the] resting posture" and "if there is an impression of a tooth on the lingual border when the patients slightly open their mouths". Others have suggested there is no objective definition of what constitutes macroglossia. Some propose a distinction between true macroglossia, when histologic abnormalities correlate with the clinical findings of tongue enlargement, and relative macroglossia, where histology does not provide a pathologic explanation for the enlargement. Common examples of true macroglossia are vascular malformations, muscular enlargement and tumors; whilst Down syndrome is an example of relative macroglossia. Pseudomacryglossia refers to a tongue that is of normal size but gives a false impression of being too large in relation to adjacent anatomical structures. The Myer classification subdivides macroglossia into generalized or localized.

== Treatment ==
Treatment and prognosis of macroglossia depends upon its cause, and also upon the severity of the enlargement and symptoms it is causing. No treatment may be required for mild cases or cases with minimal symptoms. Speech therapy may be beneficial, or surgery to reduce the size of the tongue (reduction glossectomy). Treatment may also involve correction of orthodontic abnormalities that may have been caused by the enlarged tongue. Treatment of any underlying systemic disease may be required, e.g. radiotherapy.

== Epidemiology ==
Macroglossia is uncommon, and usually occurs in children. Macroglossia has been reported to have a positive family history in 6% of cases. The National Organization of Rare Disorders lists macroglossia as a rare disease (fewer than 200,000 individuals in the US).
