= DIS3L2 =

Protein-coding gene in the species Homo sapiens

Identifiers
- Aliases: DIS3L2, FAM6A, PRLMNS, hDIS3 like 3'-5' exoribonuclease 2
- External IDs: OMIM: 614184; MGI: 2442555; GeneCards: DIS3L2

Gene location (Human)
Chr.	Chromosome 2 (human)
Band	2q37.1	Start	231,961,245 bp
Band	2q37.1	End	232,344,350 bp

Gene location (Mouse)
Chr.	Chromosome 1 (mouse)
Band	1|1 C5	Start	86,631,530 bp
Band	1|1 C5	End	86,977,817 bp
RNA expression pattern
Bgee	Human / Mouse (ortholog); Top expressed in: sural nerve; sperm; buccal mucosa cell; right uterine tube; right lobe of thyroid gland; right testis; left testis; Achilles tendon; left lobe of thyroid gland; left ovary / Top expressed in: spermatid; Rostral migratory stream; hand; spermatocyte; lumbar spinal ganglion; lens; muscle of thigh; genital tubercle; lumbar subsegment of spinal cord; neural tube; More reference expression data
BioGPS	n/a
Gene ontology
Molecular function	3'-5'-exoribonuclease activity; poly(U) RNA binding; metal ion binding; ribonuclease activity; protein binding; RNA binding; nuclease activity; exonuclease activity; hydrolase activity; magnesium ion binding
Cellular component	cytoplasm; polysome; P-body; exosome (RNase complex)
Biological process	miRNA catabolic process; nucleic acid phosphodiester bond hydrolysis; nuclear-transcribed mRNA catabolic process, exonucleolytic, 3'-5'; cell division; stem cell population maintenance; rRNA processing; cell cycle; mitotic sister chromatid separation; negative regulation of cell population proliferation; RNA phosphodiester bond hydrolysis, exonucleolytic; RNA phosphodiester bond hydrolysis; nuclear-transcribed mRNA catabolic process, exonucleolytic; polyuridylation-dependent mRNA catabolic process; mitotic cell cycle; RNA catabolic process
Sources:Amigo / QuickGO
Orthologs
Databases	NCBI: entry; OMA: entry
Species	Human	Mouse
Entrez	129563	208718
Ensembl	ENSG00000144535	ENSMUSG00000053333
UniProt	Q8IYB7	Q8CI75
RefSeq (mRNA)	NM_001257281; NM_001257282; NM_152383	NM_001172157; NM_153530
RefSeq (protein)	NP_001244210; NP_001244211; NP_689596	NP_001165628; NP_705758
Location (UCSC)	Chr 2: 231.96 – 232.34 Mb	Chr 1: 86.63 – 86.98 Mb
PubMed search
- Wikidata
View/Edit Human	View/Edit Mouse

DIS3 mitotic control homolog (S. cerevisiae)-like 2 is a protein in humans that is encoded by the DIS3L2 gene. The protein encoded by this gene is similar in sequence to 3'/5' exonucleolytic subunits of the RNA exosome. The exosome is a large multimeric ribonucleotide complex responsible for degrading various RNA substrates. Several transcript variants, some protein-coding and some not, have been found for this gene. [provided by RefSeq, Mar 2012].

== Clinical significance ==
Mutations in DIS3L2 cause Perlman syndrome.
