= Sotos syndrome =

Genetic overgrowth disorder

- Other names: Cerebral gigantism or Sotos-Dodge syndrome
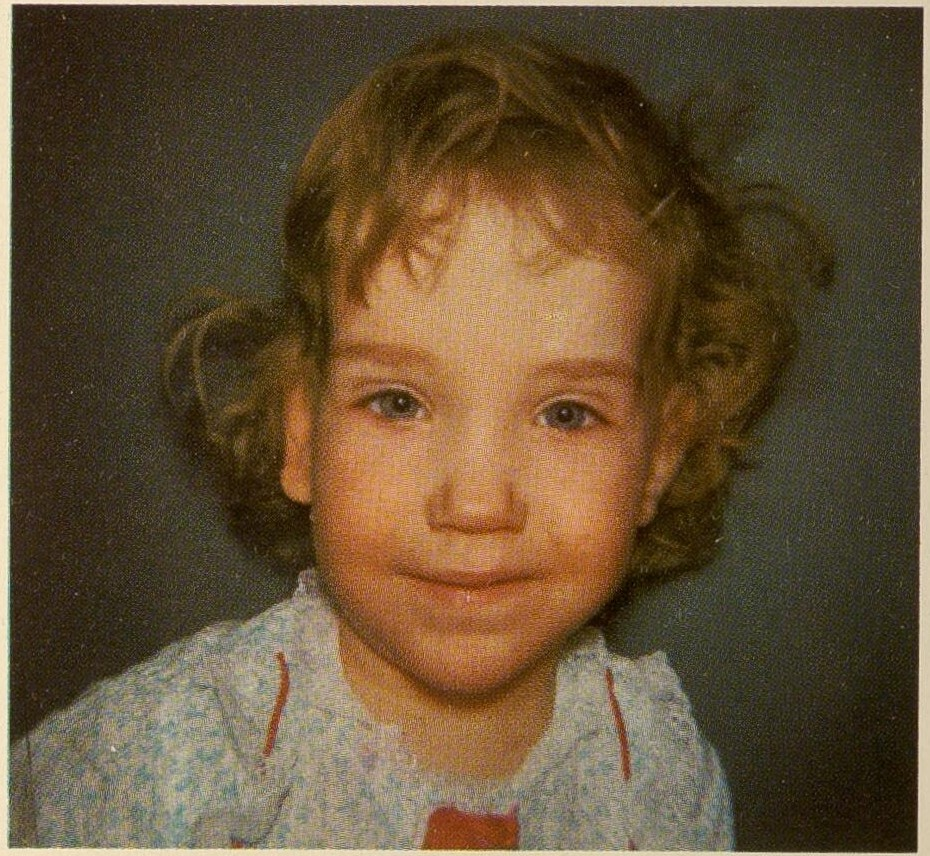
- Girl displaying characteristic facial features of Sotos syndrome
- Specialty: Medical genetics
- Frequency: 0.005%

Sotos syndrome is a rare genetic disorder characterized by excessive physical growth during the first years of life. Excessive growth often starts in infancy and continues into the early teen years. The disorder may be accompanied by autism, mild intellectual disability, delayed motor, cognitive, and social development, hypotonia (low muscle tone), and speech impairments. Children with Sotos syndrome tend to be large at birth and are often taller, heavier, and have larger skulls (macrocephaly) than is normal for their age. Signs of the disorder, which vary among individuals, include a disproportionately large skull with a slightly protrusive forehead, large hands and feet, large mandible, hypertelorism (an abnormally increased distance between the eyes), and downslanting eyes. Clumsiness, an awkward gait, and unusual aggressiveness or irritability may also occur.

Although most cases of Sotos syndrome occur sporadically, familial cases have also been reported. It is similar to Weaver syndrome.

== Signs and symptoms ==
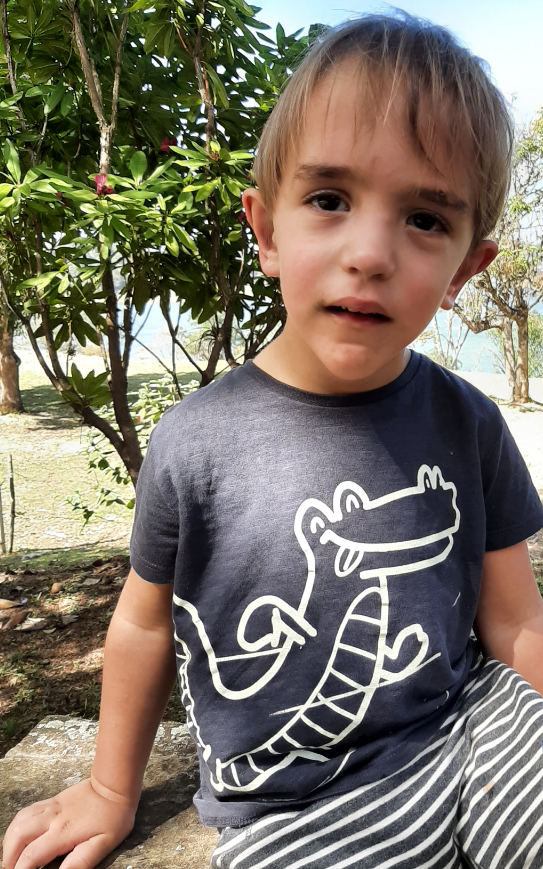
A child with Sotos syndrome showing characteristic facial features

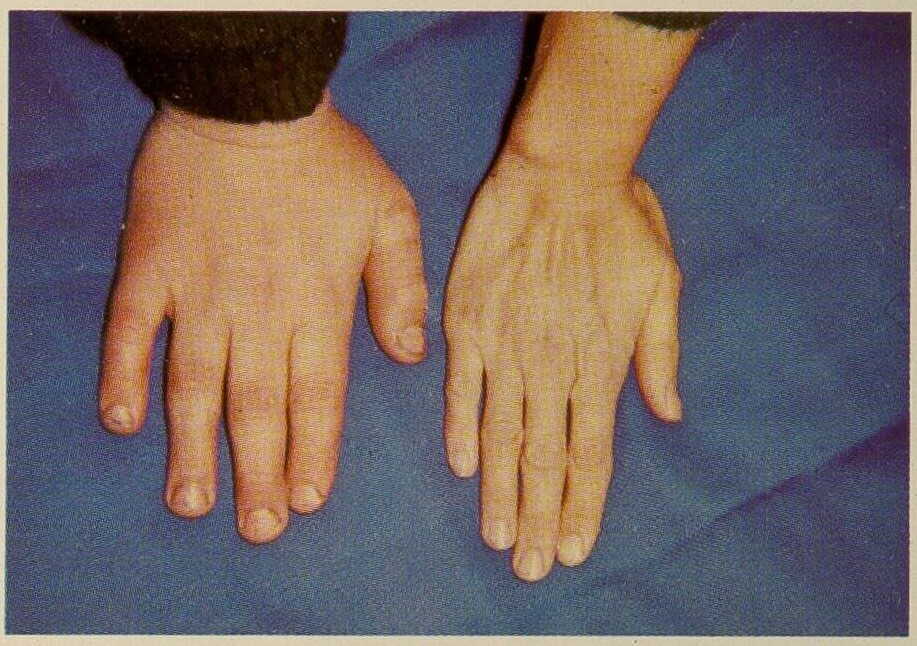
Sotos syndrome in the hand, showing enlargement

The classic features of Sotos syndrome are a characteristic facial appearance, learning disability, and height and/or weight circumference greater than 2 standard deviations over the mean. Characteristic facial features include a long face, broad forehead, sparse hair over the forehead and side of the head, downslanting palpebral fissures, narrow jaw, long chin, and flushing of the cheeks. The facial appearance is most notable in early childhood. Affected infants and children tend to grow quickly; they are significantly taller than their siblings and peers, and have an unusually large skull and large head. Adult height is usually in the normal range, although Broc Brown has the condition and was named the world's tallest teenager; as of late 2016, he was 2.34 m (7 ft 8 in) tall and still growing.

Individuals with Sotos syndrome often have intellectual impairment, and most also display behavioral impairments. During early development, these individuals may have delayed motor skills, poor coordination, and problems with feeding. Later on they may have trouble with nonverbal reasoning and quantitative reasoning. Intellectual impairment in Sotos syndrome is usually mild and does not worsen over time. Behavioral impairments may include attention deficit hyperactivity disorder (ADHD), phobias, obsessive compulsive disorder, autism, tantrums, and impulsive behaviors (impulse control disorder). Problems with speech and language are also common. Affected individuals may often have stuttering, difficulty with sound production, or a monotone voice. Additionally, weak muscle tone (hypotonia) may delay other aspects of early development, particularly motor skills such as sitting and crawling.

Other major features of Sotos syndrome include heart abnormalities, brain abnormalities, joint hypermobility, hearing loss, vision problems, vesicoureteral reflux, scoliosis, and seizures. Signs of Sotos syndrome can be seen in the before birth as well with increased nuchal translucency, large head size, polyhydramnios, fetal overgrowth, renal abnormalities or cranial abnormalities. Those pregnant with an affected fetus may experience maternal pre-eclampsia. Some infants with this disorder experience jaundice and poor feeding at birth. A small number of patients with Sotos syndrome (about 3%) have developed cancer, most often in childhood, but no single form of cancer has been associated with this condition. Some of the cancers reported in Sotos syndrome include Wilms tumor, hepatoblastoma, neuroblastoma, sacrococcygeal teratoma, presacral ganglioma, acute lymphocytic leukemia, small cell lung cancer, and astrocytomas. It remains uncertain whether Sotos syndrome increases the risk of specific types of cancer. If persons with this disorder have any increased cancer risk, their risk is only slightly greater than that of the general population.

== Genetics ==
Autosomal dominant inheritance

Loss of function mutations in the NSD1 gene lead to the development of Sotos syndrome. The NSD1 gene provides instructions for making a protein (histone-lysine N-methyltransferase) that is expressed mainly in the brain, kidney, muscle, spleen, thymus, and lung. In Sotos syndrome, a mutation in the NSD1 gene prevents the production of this protein. The specific function of this protein is not yet known but studies show that it is involved in histone modification, which affects transcription of other genes. It is unclear how a reduced amount of this protein during development leads to learning disabilities, overgrowth, and the other features of Sotos syndrome.

Mutations leading to Sotos syndrome can be sporadic or inherited in an autosomal dominant pattern. About 95 percent of Sotos syndrome cases occur by spontaneous mutation involving the NSD1 gene. 5 percent of individuals with Sotos syndrome have one affected parent. In the Japanese population, the most common genetic change leading to Sotos syndrome is a microdeletion in the region of chromosome 5 containing the NSD1 gene (5q35 microdeletion). This genetic mutation is responsible for over 50 percent of Sotos cases in Japan compared to only 10 percent worldwide. In other populations, such as in Europe and the USA, small mutations called intragenic mutations within the NSD1 gene cause a majority of Sotos cases. Individuals with a 5q35 microdeletion in the NSD1 gene tend to have less overgrowth symptoms and more severe learning disabilities than those with an intragenic mutation. 7 to 35 percent of Sotos patients have no NSD1 anomalies.

== Diagnosis ==
Diagnosis of Sotos syndrome is usually made during childhood and is based on clinical examination and bone age. The clinical evaluation begins with a physician conducting a thorough history and physical examination, focusing on signs of excessive growth along with other previously mentioned symptoms. Family history is particularly important to identify any affected family members and provide genetic counseling if necessary. Physicians will also perform an assessment of growth velocity with growth charts and head circumference measurements. Bone age is determined by obtaining an X-ray. Additional diagnostic tests may be performed to rule out other disorders. This includes a complete blood count, karyotype analysis, and measurement of IGF-1, IGFBP-3, free T4, and TSH levels. There are no biochemical markers for Sotos syndrome. The diagnosis is confirmed through genetic testing. Physicians will obtain a blood or saliva sample for genetic testing which looks for a mutation within the NSD1 gene. If there is clinical suspicion of Sotos syndrome in a fetus, physicians may perform genetic testing on the fetus.

== Treatment ==
Treatment of Sotos syndrome is symptomatic. As an infant, those with Sotos syndrome may require treatment for jaundice, vesicuoureteral reflux, and poor feeding. Children with Sotos syndrome should follow up closely with their primary care provider and any other specialists that are necessary in order to monitor for the development of complications such as seizures, infections, scoliosis, and more as discussed above. Screening for tumors is not recommended as the probability of occurrence is less than 3 percent. Patients should also be connected with occupational therapy, speech therapy, psychology and adaptive physical education to support their unique intellectual and physical needs. Those with Sotos syndrome may additionally require special education classes, but not always.

== Prognosis ==
Sotos syndrome is not a life-threatening disorder and patients may have a normal life expectancy. Developmental delays may improve in the school-age years; however, coordination problems may persist into adulthood, along with any learning disabilities and/or other physical or mental issues.

== Epidemiology ==
Incidence is approximately 1 in 14,000 births.

== See also ==
- Beckwith-Wiedemann syndrome
- Perlman syndrome
- Proteus syndrome
- Gigantism
- Malan Syndrome
- Fragile X
- Luscan-Lumish syndrome
