= NSD1 =

Mammalian protein found in Homo sapiens

Identifiers
- Aliases: NSD1, ARA267, KMT3B, SOTOS, SOTOS1, STO, nuclear receptor binding SET domain protein 1
- External IDs: OMIM: 606681; MGI: 1276545; GeneCards: NSD1
Available structures
PDB	Ortholog search: PDBe RCSB
PDB	List of PDB id codes 3OOI
Enzyme activity
EC #	BRENDA	ExPASy	KEGG	MetaCyc
2.1.1.357	↗	↗	↗	↗

Gene location (Human)
Chr.	Chromosome 5 (human)
Band	5q35.3	Start	177,131,830 bp
Band	5q35.3	End	177,300,213 bp

Gene location (Mouse)
Chr.	Chromosome 13 (mouse)
Band	13|13 B1	Start	55,357,595 bp
Band	13|13 B1	End	55,466,138 bp
RNA expression pattern
Bgee	Human / Mouse (ortholog); Top expressed in: sural nerve; epithelium of colon; Achilles tendon; ventricular zone; testicle; ganglionic eminence; monocyte; sperm; tonsil; corpus callosum / Top expressed in: ascending aorta; aortic valve; genital tubercle; tail of embryo; Rostral migratory stream; pineal gland; supraoptic nucleus; vas deferens; ventricular zone; mesenteric lymph nodes; More reference expression data
BioGPS	n/a
Gene ontology
Molecular function	methyltransferase activity; transferase activity; histone methyltransferase activity (H4-K20 specific); transcription corepressor activity; chromatin binding; transcription coregulator activity; metal ion binding; retinoid X receptor binding; thyroid hormone receptor binding; androgen receptor binding; retinoic acid receptor binding; estrogen receptor binding; histone-lysine N-methyltransferase activity; histone methyltransferase activity (H3-K36 specific); zinc ion binding; protein binding; RNA polymerase II cis-regulatory region sequence-specific DNA binding
Cellular component	nucleoplasm; chromosome; nucleus; chromatin
Biological process	regulation of transcription, DNA-templated; negative regulation of transcription by RNA polymerase II; transcription, DNA-templated; positive regulation of transcription, DNA-templated; methylation; regulation of peptidyl-serine phosphorylation; regulation of histone H3-K36 methylation; histone lysine methylation; histone methylation; regulation of RNA polymerase II regulatory region sequence-specific DNA binding; histone H3-K36 methylation; histone H4-K20 methylation; chromatin organization
Sources:Amigo / QuickGO
Orthologs
Databases	NCBI: entry; OMA: entry
Species	Human	Mouse
Entrez	64324	18193
Ensembl	ENSG00000165671	ENSMUSG00000021488
UniProt	Q96L73	O88491
RefSeq (mRNA)	NM_022455; NM_172349; NM_001365684	NM_008739
RefSeq (protein)	NP_071900; NP_758859; NP_001352613	n/a
Location (UCSC)	Chr 5: 177.13 – 177.3 Mb	Chr 13: 55.36 – 55.47 Mb
PubMed search
- Wikidata
View/Edit Human	View/Edit Mouse

NSD1 (Nuclear receptor binding SET Domain Protein 1) is a transcription coregulator protein that encodes Histone Methyltransferase and is associated with Sotos syndrome and Weaver syndrome.
