= Overgrowth syndrome =

Group of rare genetic disorders involving tissue hypertrophy

Overgrowth syndromes in children constitute a group of rare disorders that are characterised by tissue hypertrophy. Individual overgrowth syndromes have been shown to overlap with regard to clinical and radiologic features. The details of the genetic bases of these syndromes are unfolding. Any of the three embryonic tissue layers may be involved. The syndromes may manifest in localized or generalized tissue overgrowth. Latitudinal and longitudinal growth may be affected. Nevertheless, the musculoskeletal features are central to the diagnosis of some syndromes such as Proteus syndrome.

The time of presentation of children with overgrowth syndromes is an important contributor to the differential diagnosis. Children with some overgrowth syndromes such as Klippel–Trénaunay syndrome can be readily detectable at birth. In contrast, other overgrowth syndromes such as Proteus syndrome usually present in the postnatal period, characteristically between the second and third year of life. In general, children with overgrowth syndromes are at increased risk of embryonic tumor development.

== List of overgrowth syndromes ==
Examples of overgrowth syndromes include:

- Beckwith–Wiedemann syndrome
- CLOVES syndrome
- Fragile X syndrome
- Klippel–Trénaunay syndrome
- Macrocephaly-capillary malformation
- Neurofibromatosis
- Proteus syndrome
- Simpson–Golabi–Behmel syndrome
- Sotos syndrome
- Sturge–Weber syndrome
- Tatton-Brown–Rahman syndrome
- Weaver syndrome

== See also ==
- Gigantism
