= Weaver syndrome =

Rare genetic overgrowth disorder

- Other names: Weaver–Smith syndrome
- Specialty: Medical genetics

Weaver syndrome is an extremely rare autosomal dominant genetic disorder associated with rapid growth beginning in the prenatal period and continuing through the toddler and youth years. It is characterized by advanced osseous maturation and distinctive craniofacial, skeletal and neurological abnormalities. It is similar to Sotos syndrome and is classified as an overgrowth syndrome.

Its genetic cause was identified in 2011 as mutations in the EZH2 gene. Forty-eight cases had been documented and confirmed as of December 2013, and its prevalence is estimated to be similar to that of Sotos syndrome, around 1 in 15,000. It was first described by American physician David Weaver in 1974.

== Signs and symptoms ==
Children with Weaver syndrome tend to look similar and have distinctive physical and craniofacial characteristics, which may include several, but not all, of the following features:

- Macrocephaly
- Large bifrontal diameter
- Flattened occiput
- Long philtrum
- Retrognathia
- Round face in infancy
- Prominent chin crease
- Large ears
- Strabismus
- Hypertelorism
- Epicanthal folds
- Downslanting palpebral fissures

Other features may include loose skin, thin deep-set nails, thin hair, short ribs, limited elbow and knee extension, camptodactyly, and a coarse, low-pitched voice. Delayed development of motor skills such as sitting, standing, and walking are commonly exhibited in early childhood. Patients with Weaver syndrome typically have mild intellectual disability with poor coordination and balance. They also have some neurological abnormalities such as speech delay, epilepsy, intellectual disability, hypotonia or hypertonia, and behavioral problems.

== Cause ==
The cause for Weaver syndrome was identified in 2011 as autosomal dominant mutations in the EZH2 gene on chromosome 7q36. EZH2 (Enhancer of Zeste, Drosophila, homolog 2) is the second histone methyltransferase associated with human overgrowth. It encodes the catalytic component of the PRC2 protein complex (Polycomb Repressive Complex 2), which regulates chromatin structure and gene expression, and has been found to repress transcription. EZH2 also has critical roles in stem cell maintenance and cell lineage determination, such as osteogenesis, myogenesis, lymphopoiesis and hematopoiesis.

It can also be associated with mutations in the histone methyltransferase NSD1 gene on chromosome 5q35. The functions of NSD1 are not clearly known, but it is thought to act as a factor in influencing transcription, which contains domains involved in chromatin-mediated regulation during development.

Most cases are found to be sporadic, with no family history of the syndrome, although there have been a few cases in families where autosomal dominant inheritance has been reported.

== Diagnosis ==
=== Differential diagnosis ===
Weaver syndrome and Sotos syndrome are often mistaken for one another due to their significant phenotypic overlap and similarities. Clinical features shared by both syndromes include overgrowth in early development, advanced bone age, developmental delay, and prominent macrocephaly. Mutations in the NSD1 gene may also be another cause for confusion. The NSD1 gene provides instructions for making a protein that is involved in normal growth and development. Deletions and mutations in the NSD1 gene is a common cause for patients with Sotos syndrome and in some cases for Weaver syndrome as well.

Features distinguishing Weaver syndrome from Sotos syndrome include broad forehead and face, ocular hypertelorism, prominent wide philtrum, micrognathia, deep-set nails, retrognathia with a prominent chin crease, increased prenatal growth, and a carpal bone age that is greatly advanced compared to metacarpal and phalangeal bone age.

== Treatment ==
There is no cure available for Weaver syndrome. However, with multidisciplinary management, such as neurological, pediatric, orthopedic and psychomotor care and genetic counseling, symptoms can be managed. Surgery may be used to correct any skeletal issues. Physical and occupational therapy are considered an option to help with muscle tone. Also, speech therapy is often recommended for speech related problems.

== Prognosis ==
With appropriate treatment and management, patients with Weaver syndrome appear to do well, both physically and intellectually, throughout their lives and have a normal lifespan. Their adult height can reach 7–8 feet (213.36–243.84 cm).

== Epidemiology ==
The incidence of Weaver syndrome is uncertain, as the causative mutation was only identified in 2011. As of December 2013, 48 cases of Weaver syndrome had been documented and confirmed. In 2012, the South West Thames Regional Genetic Service at St George's Hospital in London, based on their detection rate among a cohort of patients within their Childhood Overgrowth Study, estimated a prevalence rate similar to that of Sotos syndrome, around 1 in 15,000.

== See also ==
- Beckwith–Wiedemann syndrome
- Perlman syndrome
