= Organomegaly =

Medical condition in which organs are larger than normal

Organomegaly is the abnormal enlargement of organs. For example, cardiomegaly is enlargement of the heart. Visceromegaly is the enlargement of abdominal organs. Examples of visceromegaly are enlarged liver (hepatomegaly), spleen (splenomegaly), stomach, kidneys, and pancreas.

== Definitions for various organs ==
Values refer to adults unless otherwise specified.

| Organ | Term for enlargement | Cutoff for definition |
|---|---|---|
| Abdominal aorta | Ectasia or mild dilation | >2.0 cm and <3.0 cm |
| Abdominal aorta | Abdominal aortic aneurysm | Moderate AAA: 3.0–5.0 cm; Large or severe AAA: >5.0 or 5.5. cm |
| Common bile duct | Dilatation | Mild dilatation: 8–12 mm; Moderate dilatation: 12–16 mm; Severe dilatation: 16–20 mm; Extremely severe dilatation: >20 mm |
| Gallbladder | Wall thickening | 3 mm wall thickness |
| Gallbladder | Hydrops | Greater than 5 cm transverse dimension |
| Heart | Cardiomegaly | Medical imaging: Indicated by cardiothoracic ratio over 0.5.; Autopsy: Cardiomegaly has been suggested when the heart weighs more than >399 grams in women and >449 grams in men. |
| Large intestine | Dilation | Upper limit of normal range of diameter: Cecum: 10.5 cm; Ascending colon: 7.0 cm; Transverse colon: 6.5 cm; descending colon and sigmoid colon: 6.8 cm; Rectum near rectal/sigmoid junction: 7.5 cm |
| Large intestine | Wall thickening | Wall thickness 5 mm |
| Kidneys | Enlargement | Medical imaging: Length >13 cm in females or >14 cm in males.; Autopsy: Sex / Upper limit of standard reference range; Sex / Right kidney / Left kidney; Men / 160 g (5.6 oz) / 175 g (6.2 oz); Women / 175 g (6.2 oz) / 190 g (6.7 oz) |
| Liver | Hepatomegaly | Medical imaging: Longitudinal axis > 15.5 cm at the hepatic midline, or > 16.0 cm at the midclavicular line; Autopsy: Weight over upper limit of standard reference range, of 1,860 g (4.10 lb) in men and 1,770 g (3.90 lb) in women. |
| Lymph nodes | Lymphadenopathy | Generally 10 mm (see Lymphadenopathy) for detailed values) |
| Renal pelvis | Part of hydronephrosis grading | 4 – 20 mm: Fetal: Anteroposterior diameter of less than 4 mm in fetuses up to 32 weeks of gestational age and 7 mm afterwards.; Adults: cutoff values defined differently by different sources, with anteroposterior diameters ranging between 10 and 20 mm. About 13% of normal healthy adults have a transverse pelvic diameter of over 10 mm. |
| Prostate | Prostatomegaly | Volume over 30 cm^{3}. |
| Pulmonary artery | Dilation | >29 mm |
| Small intestine | Dilation | 2.5 cm on CT scans; Mild: 2.5–2.9 cm; Moderate: 3-4 cm; Severe: >4 cm; 3 cm on abdominal X-rays (Projectional radiography confers a geometric magnification compared to CT) |
| Small intestine | Wall thickening | 3–5 mm |
| Spleen | Splenomegaly | Medical imaging: Largest dimension of over 11 cm, or craniocaudal height of 13 cm.; Moderate splenomegaly: the largest dimension is between 11–20 cm; Severe splenomegaly: the largest dimension is greater than 20 cm; Autopsy: Weight over upper limit of standard reference range, of 230 g (8.1 oz) |
| Thoracic aorta | Dilation | Diameters: >3.5 cm generally; Upper limits of standard reference range: Ascending aorta: 3.3 cm in small young individuals; 4.3 cm among large elderly individuals.; Descending thoracic aorta, 2.3 cm among small young individuals; 3.2 cm among large elderly individuals. |
| Thoracic aorta | Thoracic aortic aneurysm | Diameter: > 4.5 cm (US); > 4.0 cm (Korea) |
| Testis | Enlargement | 5 cm (long axis) x 3 cm (short axis) |
| Tonsil | Enlarged tonsil | 2.5 cm in length, 2.0 cm in width and 1.2 cm in thickness. |
| Ureter | Megaureter | 6 or 7 mm |
| Urinary bladder | Wall thickening | 3–5 mm thick, and < 3 mm when well distended. |
