= DNA oxidation =

Process of oxidative damage of deoxyribonucleic acid

For physico-chemical aspects of the oxidation process see the main article on guanine radical cations.

DNA oxidation is the process of oxidative damage of deoxyribonucleic acid. As described in detail by Burrows et al., 8-oxo-2'-deoxyguanosine (8-oxo-dG) is the most common oxidative lesion observed in duplex DNA because guanosine has a lower one-electron reduction potential than the other nucleosides in DNA. The one electron reduction potentials of the nucleosides (in volts versus NHE) are guanine 1.29, adenine 1.42, cytosine 1.6 and thymine 1.7. About 1 in 40,000 guanines in the genome are present as 8-oxo-dG under normal conditions. This means that >30,000 8-oxo-dGs may exist at any given time in the genome of a human cell. Another product of DNA oxidation is 8-oxo-dA. 8-oxo-dA occurs at about 1/10 the frequency of 8-oxo-dG. The reduction potential of guanine may be reduced by as much as 50%, depending on the particular neighboring nucleosides stacked next to it within DNA.

Excess DNA oxidation is linked to certain diseases and cancers, while normal levels of oxidized nucleotides, due to normal levels of ROS, may be necessary for memory and learning.

== Oxidized bases in DNA ==
When DNA undergoes oxidative damage, two of the most common damages change guanine to 8-hydroxyguanine or to 2,6-diamino-4-hydroxy-5-formamidopyrimidine.

More than 20 oxidatively damaged DNA base lesions were identified in 2003 by Cooke et al. and these overlap the 12 oxidized bases reported in 1992 by Dizdaroglu. Two of the most frequently oxidized bases found by Dizdaroglu after ionizing radiation (causing oxidative stress) were the two oxidation products of guanine shown in the figure. One of these products was 8-OH-Gua (8-hydroxyguanine). (The article 8-oxo-2'-deoxyguanosine refers to the same damaged base since the keto form 8-oxo-Gua described there may undergo a tautomeric shift to the enol form 8-OH-Gua shown here.) The other product was FapyGua (2,6-diamino-4-hydroxy-5-formamidopyrimidine). Another frequent oxidation product was 5-OH-Hyd (5-hydroxyhydantoin) derived from cytosine.

== Removal of oxidized bases ==
Most oxidized bases are removed from DNA by enzymes operating within the base excision repair pathway. Removal of oxidized bases in DNA is fairly rapid. For example, 8-oxo-dG was increased 10-fold in the livers of mice subjected to ionizing radiation, but the excess 8-oxo-dG was removed with a half-life of 11 minutes.

== Steady-state levels of DNA damage ==
Steady-state levels of endogenous DNA damages represent the balance between formation and repair. Swenberg et al. measured average amounts of steady state endogenous DNA damages in mammalian cells. The seven most common damages they found are shown in Table 1. Only one directly oxidized base, 8-hydroxyguanine, at about 2,400 8-OH-G per cell, was among the most frequent DNA damages present in the steady-state.

Table 1. Steady-state amounts of endogenous DNA damages
Endogenous lesions	Number per cell
Abasic sites	30,000
N7-(2-hydroxethyl)guanine (7HEG)	3,000
8-hydroxyguanine	2,400
7-(2-oxoethyl)guanine	1,500
Formaldehyde adducts	960
Acrolein-deoxyguanine	120
Malondialdehyde-deoxyguanine	60

== Increased 8-oxo-dG in carcinogenesis and disease ==
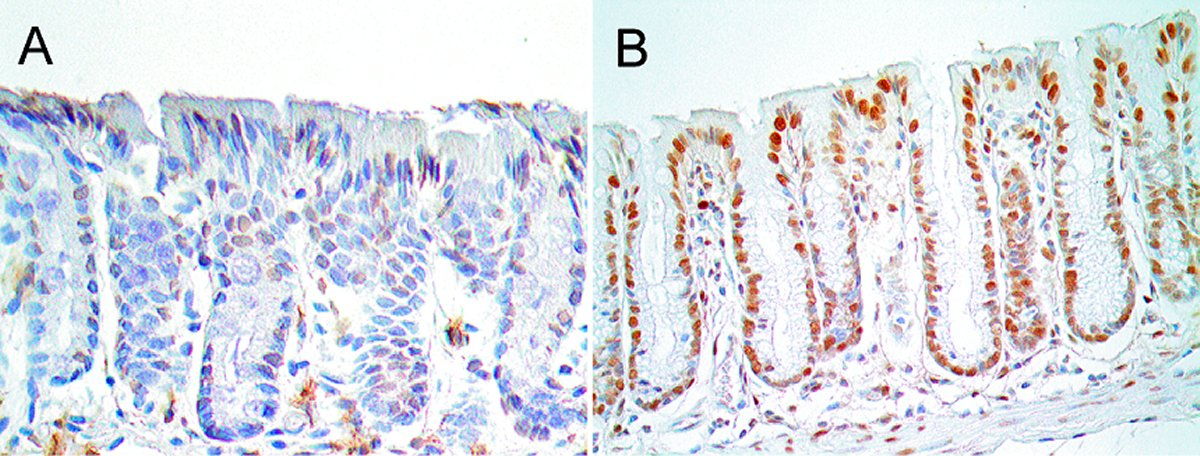
Colonic epithelium from a mouse not undergoing colonic tumorigenesis (A), and a mouse that is undergoing colonic tumorigenesis (B). Cell nuclei are stained dark blue with hematoxylin (for nucleic acid) and immunostained brown for 8-oxo-dG. The level of 8-oxo-dG was graded in the nuclei of colonic crypt cells on a scale of 0-4. Mice not undergoing tumorigenesis had crypt 8-oxo-dG at levels 0 to 2 (panel A shows level 1) while mice progressing to colonic tumors had 8-oxo-dG in colonic crypts at levels 3 to 4 (panel B shows level 4) Tumorigenesis was induced by adding deoxycholate to the mouse diet to give a level of deoxycholate in the mouse colon similar to the level in the colon of humans on a high fat diet. The images were made from original photomicrographs.

As reviewed by Valavanidis et al. increased levels of 8-oxo-dG in a tissue can serve as a biomarker of oxidative stress. They also noted that increased levels of 8-oxo-dG are frequently found associated with carcinogenesis and disease.

In the figure shown in this section, the colonic epithelium from a mouse on a normal diet has a low level of 8-oxo-dG in its colonic crypts (panel A). However, a mouse likely undergoing colonic tumorigenesis (due to deoxycholate added to its diet) has a high level of 8-oxo-dG in its colonic epithelium (panel B). Deoxycholate increases intracellular production of reactive oxygen resulting in increased oxidative stress, and this may contribute to tumorigenesis and carcinogenesis. Of 22 mice fed the diet supplemented with deoxycholate, 20 (91%) developed colonic tumors after 10 months on the diet, and the tumors in 10 of these mice (45% of mice) included an adenocarcinoma (cancer). Cooke et al. point out that a number of diseases, such as Alzheimer's disease and systemic lupus erythematosus, have elevated 8-oxo-dG but no increased carcinogenesis.

== Indirect role of oxidative damage in carcinogenesis ==
Valavanidis et al. pointed out that oxidative DNA damage, such as 8-oxo-dG, may contribute to carcinogenesis by two mechanisms. The first mechanism involves modulation of gene expression, whereas the second is through the induction of mutations.

=== Epigenetic alterations ===
Epigenetic alteration, for instance by methylation of CpG islands in a promoter region of a gene, can repress expression of the gene (see DNA methylation in cancer). In general, epigenetic alteration can modulate gene expression. As reviewed by Bernstein and Bernstein, the repair of various types of DNA damages can, with low frequency, leave remnants of the different repair processes and thereby cause epigenetic alterations. 8-oxo-dG is primarily repaired by base excision repair (BER). Li et al. reviewed studies indicating that one or more BER proteins also participate(s) in epigenetic alterations involving DNA methylation, demethylation or reactions coupled to histone modification. Nishida et al. examined 8-oxo-dG levels and also evaluated promoter methylation of 11 tumor suppressor genes (TSGs) in 128 liver biopsy samples. These biopsies were taken from patients with chronic hepatitis C, a condition causing oxidative damages in the liver. Among 5 factors evaluated, only increased levels of 8-oxo-dG was highly correlated with promoter methylation of TSGs (p<0.0001). This promoter methylation could have reduced expression of these tumor suppressor genes and contributed to carcinogenesis.

=== Mutagenesis ===
Yasui et al. examined the fate of 8-oxo-dG when this oxidized derivative of deoxyguanosine was inserted into the thymidine kinase gene in a chromosome within human lymphoblastoid cells in culture. They inserted 8-oxo-dG into about 800 cells, and could detect the products that occurred after the insertion of this altered base, as determined from the clones produced after growth of the cells. 8-oxo-dG was restored to G in 86% of the clones, probably reflecting accurate base excision repair or translesion synthesis without mutation. G:C to T:A transversions occurred in 5.9% of the clones, single base deletions in 2.1% and G:C to C:G transversions in 1.2%. Together, these more common mutations totaled 9.2% of the 14% of mutations generated at the site of the 8-oxo-dG insertion. Among the other mutations in the 800 clones analyzed, there were also 3 larger deletions, of sizes 6, 33 and 135 base pairs. Thus 8-oxo-dG, if not repaired, can directly cause frequent mutations, some of which may contribute to carcinogenesis.

== Role of DNA oxidation in gene regulation ==
As reviewed by Wang et al., oxidized guanine appears to have multiple regulatory roles in gene expression. As noted by Wang et al., genes prone to be actively transcribed are densely distributed in high GC-content regions of the genome. They then described three modes of gene regulation by DNA oxidation at guanine. In one mode, it appears that oxidative stress may produce 8-oxo-dG in a promoter of a gene. The oxidative stress may also inactivate OGG1. The inactive OGG1, which no longer excises 8-oxo-dG, nevertheless targets and complexes with 8-oxo-dG, and causes a sharp (~70^{o}) bend in the DNA. This allows the assembly of a transcriptional initiation complex, up-regulating transcription of the associated gene. The experimental basis establishing this mode was also reviewed by Seifermann and Epe

A second mode of gene regulation by DNA oxidation at a guanine, occurs when an 8-oxo-dG is formed in a guanine rich, potential G-quadruplex-forming sequence (PQS) in the coding strand of a promoter, after which active OGG1 excises the 8-oxo-dG and generates an apurinic/apyrimidinic site (AP site). The AP site enables melting of the duplex to unmask the PQS, adopting a G-quadruplex fold (G4 structure/motif) that has a regulatory role in transcription activation.

A third mode of gene regulation by DNA oxidation at a guanine, occurs when 8-oxo-dG is complexed with OGG1 and then recruits chromatin remodelers to modulate gene expression. Chromodomain helicase DNA-binding protein 4 (CHD4), a component of the (NuRD) complex, is recruited by OGG1 to oxidative DNA damage sites. CHD4 then attracts DNA and histone methylating enzymes that repress transcription of associated genes.

Seifermann and Epe noted that the highly selective induction of 8-oxo-dG in the promoter sequences observed in transcription induction may be difficult to explain as a consequence of general oxidative stress. However, there appears to be a mechanism for site-directed generation of oxidized bases in promoter regions. Perillo et al., showed that the lysine-specific histone demethylase LSD1 generates a local burst of reactive oxygen species (ROS) that induces oxidation of nearby nucleotides when carrying out its function. As a specific example, after treatment of cells with an estrogen, LSD1 produced H_{2}O_{2} as a by-product of its enzymatic activity. The oxidation of DNA by LSD1 in the course of the demethylation of histone H3 at lysine 9 was shown to be required for the recruitment of OGG1 and also topoisomerase IIβ to the promoter region of bcl-2, an estrogen-responsive gene, and subsequent transcription initiation.

8-oxo-dG does not occur randomly in the genome. In mouse embryonic fibroblasts, a 2 to 5-fold enrichment of 8-oxo-dG was found in genetic control regions, including promoters, 5'-untranslated regions and 3'-untranslated regions compared to 8-oxo-dG levels found in gene bodies and in intergenic regions. In rat pulmonary artery endothelial cells, when 22,414 protein-coding genes were examined for locations of 8-oxo-dG, the majority of 8-oxo-dGs (when present) were found in promoter regions rather than within gene bodies. Among hundreds of genes whose expression levels were affected by hypoxia, those with newly acquired promoter 8-oxo-dGs were upregulated, and those genes whose promoters lost 8-oxo-dGs were almost all downregulated.

== Positive role of 8-oxo-dG in memory ==
Oxidation of guanine, particularly within CpG sites, may be especially important in learning and memory. Methylation of cytosines occurs at 60–90% of CpG sites depending on the tissue type. In the mammalian brain, ~62% of CpGs are methylated. Methylation of CpG sites tends to stably silence genes. More than 500 of these CpG sites are de-methylated in neuron DNA during memory formation and memory consolidation in the hippocampus and cingulate cortex regions of the brain. As indicated below, the first step in de-methylation of methylated cytosine at a CpG site is oxidation of the guanine to form 8-oxo-dG.

=== Role of oxidized guanine in DNA de-methylation ===
Initiation of DNA demethylation at a CpG site. In adult somatic cells DNA methylation typically occurs in the context of CpG dinucleotides (CpG sites), forming 5-methylcytosine-pG, or 5mCpG. Reactive oxygen species (ROS) may attack guanine at the dinucleotide site, forming 8-hydroxy-2'-deoxyguanosine (8-OHdG), and resulting in a 5mCp-8-OHdG dinucleotide site. The base excision repair enzyme OGG1 targets 8-OHdG and binds to the lesion without immediate excision. OGG1, present at a 5mCp-8-OHdG site recruits TET1 and TET1 oxidizes the 5mC adjacent to the 8-OHdG. This initiates demethylation of 5mC.

Demethylation of 5-Methylcytosine (5mC) in neuron DNA. As reviewed in 2018, in brain neurons, 5mC is oxidized by the ten-eleven translocation (TET) family of dioxygenases (TET1, TET2, TET3) to generate 5-hydroxymethylcytosine (5hmC). In successive steps TET enzymes further hydroxylate 5hmC to generate 5-formylcytosine (5fC) and 5-carboxylcytosine (5caC). Thymine-DNA glycosylase (TDG) recognizes the intermediate bases 5fC and 5caC and excises the glycosidic bond resulting in an apyrimidinic site (AP site). In an alternative oxidative deamination pathway, 5hmC can be oxidatively deaminated by activity-induced cytidine deaminase/apolipoprotein B mRNA editing complex (AID/APOBEC) deaminases to form 5-hydroxymethyluracil (5hmU) or 5mC can be converted to thymine (Thy). 5hmU can be cleaved by TDG, single-strand-selective monofunctional uracil-DNA glycosylase 1 (SMUG1), Nei-Like DNA Glycosylase 1 (NEIL1), or methyl-CpG binding protein 4 (MBD4). AP sites and T:G mismatches are then repaired by base excision repair (BER) enzymes to yield cytosine (Cyt).

The first figure in this section shows a CpG site where the cytosine is methylated to form 5-methylcytosine (5mC) and the guanine is oxidized to form 8-oxo-2'-deoxyguanosine (in the figure this is shown in the tautomeric form 8-OHdG). When this structure is formed, the base excision repair enzyme OGG1 targets 8-OHdG and binds to the lesion without immediate excision. OGG1, present at a 5mCp-8-OHdG site recruits TET1, and TET1 oxidizes the 5mC adjacent to the 8-OHdG. This initiates de-methylation of 5mC. TET1 is a key enzyme involved in de-methylating 5mCpG. However, TET1 is only able to act on 5mCpG if the guanine was first oxidized to form 8-hydroxy-2'-deoxyguanosine (8-OHdG or its tautomer 8-oxo-dG), resulting in a 5mCp-8-OHdG dinucleotide (see first figure in this section). This initiates the de-methylation pathway on the methylated cytosine, finally resulting in an unmethylated cytosine, shown in the second figure in this section.

Altered protein expression in neurons, due to changes in methylation of DNA, (likely controlled by 8-oxo-dG-dependent de-methylation of CpG sites in gene promoters within neuron DNA) has been established as central to memory formation.

== Neurological conditions ==
=== Bipolar disorder ===
Evidence that oxidative stress induced DNA damage plays a role in bipolar disorder has been reviewed by Raza et al. Bipolar patients have elevated levels of oxidatively induced DNA base damages even during periods of stable mental state. The level of the base excision repair enzyme OGG1 that removes certain oxidized bases from DNA is also reduced compared to healthy individuals.

=== Depressive disorder ===
Major depressive disorder is associated with an increase in oxidative DNA damage. Increases in oxidative modifications of purines and pyrimidines in depressive patients may be due to impaired repair of oxidative DNA damages.

=== Schizophrenia ===
Postmortem studies of elderly patients with chronic schizophrenia showed that oxidative DNA damage is increased in the hippocampus region of the brain. The mean proportion of neurons with the oxidized DNA base 8-oxo-dG was 10-fold higher in patients with schizophrenia than in comparison individuals. Evidence indicating a role of oxidative DNA damage in schizophrenia has been reviewed by Raza et al. and Markkanen et al.

== RNA Oxidation ==
RNAs in native milieu are exposed to various insults. Among these threats, oxidative stress is one of the major causes of damage to RNAs. The level of oxidative stress that a cell endures is reflected by the quantity of reactive oxygen species (ROS). ROS are generated from normal oxygen metabolism in cells and are recognized as a list of active molecules, such as O_{2}^{•−}, _{1}O_{2}, H_{2}O_{2} and, •OH . A nucleic acid can be oxidized by ROS through a Fenton reaction. To date, around 20 oxidative lesions have been discovered in DNA. RNAs are likely to be more sensitive to ROS for the following reasons: i) the basically single-stranded structure exposes more sites to ROS; ii) compared with nuclear DNA, RNAs are less compartmentalized; iii) RNAs distribute broadly in cells not only in the nucleus as DNAs do, but also in large portions in the cytoplasm. This theory has been supported by a series of discoveries from rat livers, human leukocytes, etc. Actually, monitoring a system by applying the isotopic label [^{18}O]-H_{2}O_{2} shows greater oxidation in cellular RNA than in DNA. Oxidation randomly damages RNAs, and each attack bring problems to the normal cellular metabolism. Although alteration of genetic information on mRNA is relatively rare, oxidation on mRNAs in vitro and in vivo results in low translation efficiency and aberrant protein products. Though the oxidation strikes the nucleic strands randomly, particular residues are more susceptible to ROS, such hotspot sites being hit by ROS at a high rate. Among all the lesions discovered thus far, one of the most abundant in DNA and RNA is the 8-hydroxyguanine. Moreover, 8-hydroxyguanine is the only one measurable among all the RNA lesions. Besides its abundance, 8-hydroxydeoxyguanosine (8-oxodG) and 8-hydroxyguanosine (8-oxoG) are identified as the most detrimental oxidation lesions for their mutagenic effect, in which this non-canonical counterpart can faultily pair with both adenine and cytosine at the same efficiency. This mis-pairing brings about the alteration of genetic information through the synthesis of DNA and RNA. In RNA, oxidation levels are mainly estimated through 8-oxoG-based assays. So far, approaches developed to directly measure 8-oxoG level include HPLC-based analysis and assays employing monoclonal anti-8-oxoG antibody. The HPLC-based method measures 8-oxoG with an electrochemical detector (ECD) and total G with a UV detector. The ratio that results from comparing the two numbers provides the extent that the total G is oxidized. Monoclonal anti-8-oxoG mouse antibody is broadly applied to directly detect this residue on either tissue sections or membrane, offering a more visual way to study its distribution in tissues and in discrete subsets of DNA or RNA. The established indirect techniques are mainly grounded on this lesion’s mutagenic aftermath, such as the lacZ assay. This method was first set up and described by Taddei and was a potentially powerful tool to understand the oxidation situation at both the RNA sequence level and single nucleotide level. Another source of oxidized RNAs is mis-incorporation of oxidized counterpart of single nucleotides. Indeed, the RNA precursor pool size is hundreds of sizes bigger than DNA’s.

== Potential factors for RNA quality control ==
There have been furious debates on whether the issue of RNA quality control does exist. However, with the concern of various lengths of half lives of diverse RNA species ranging from several minutes to hours, degradation of defective RNA can not easily be attributed to its transient character anymore. Indeed, reaction with ROS takes only few minutes, which is even shorter than the average life-span of the most unstable RNAs. Adding the fact that stable RNA take the lion’s share of total RNA, RNA error deleting becomes hypercritical and should not be neglected anymore. This theory is upheld by the fact that level of oxidized RNA decreases after removal of the oxidative challenge. Some potential factors include ribonucleases, which are suspected to selectively degrade damaged RNAs under stresses. Also enzymes working at RNA precursor pool level, are known to control quality of RNA sequence by changing error precursor to the form that can't be included directly into nascent strand.
