= C10H13N5O5 =

The molecular formula C_{10}H_{13}N_{5}O_{5} (molar mass: 283.24 g/mol, exact mass: 283.0917 u) may refer to:

- Guanosine
- 8-Oxo-2'-deoxyguanosine (8-OxO-dG)
