= Beck–Fahrner syndrome =

Rare genetic disorder

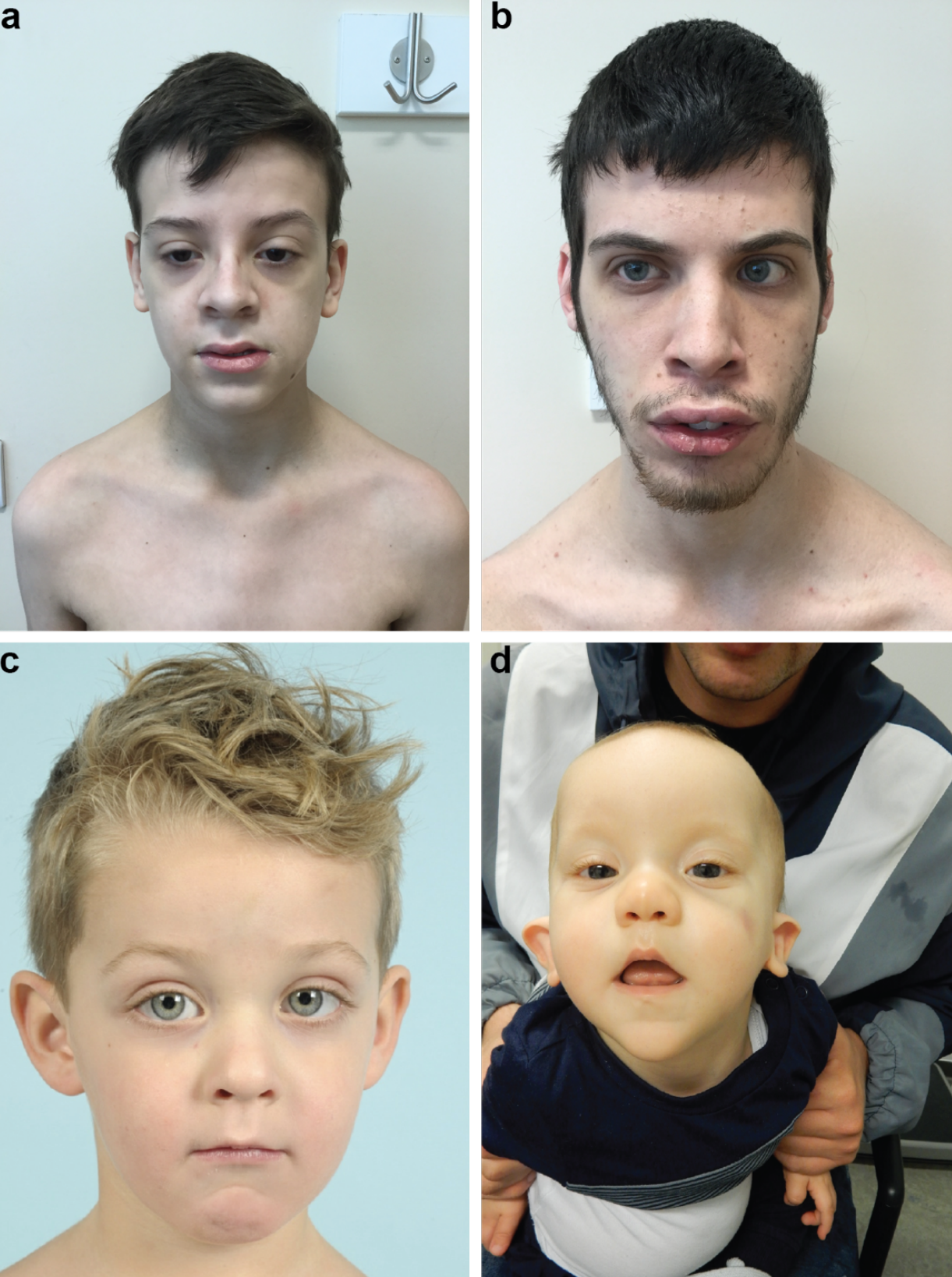
- Facial features generally include a long face with a broad forehead, an open mouth appearance, arched eyebrows, and protruding ears.
- Specialty: Medical genetics and genomics

Beck–Fahrner syndrome, also known as BEFAHRS and TET3 deficiency, is an ultra-rare genetic disorder caused by pathogenic variants of the TET3 gene. The clinical presentation varies among individuals, but typically includes global developmental delay, slow progress in mental and physical activities, syndromic autism, decreased muscle tone, epilepsy and dysmorphic features. Pathogenic variants in the TET3 gene disrupt DNA demethylation during embryogenesis, an essential epigenetic process contributing to the early development of the nervous system. The condition can occur spontaneously or be inherited in an autosomal dominant manner.

Diagnosis involves molecular and genetic testing in the context of typical symptoms. Management is supportive, aimed at improving quality of life—typically involving developmental and behavioral therapies, educational support, and monitoring by specialists such as physician geneticists, developmental pediatricians, neurologists and different therapists. As of 2023, approximately 50 individuals have been diagnosed with Beck–Fahrner syndrome.

== Presentation ==
Beck–Fahrner syndrome, also referred to as "BEFAHRS", is characterized by a mnemonic encompassing its prominent features: behavioral differences, epilepsy, facial features, autistic features, hypotonia, retardation of psychomotor development, and size differences.

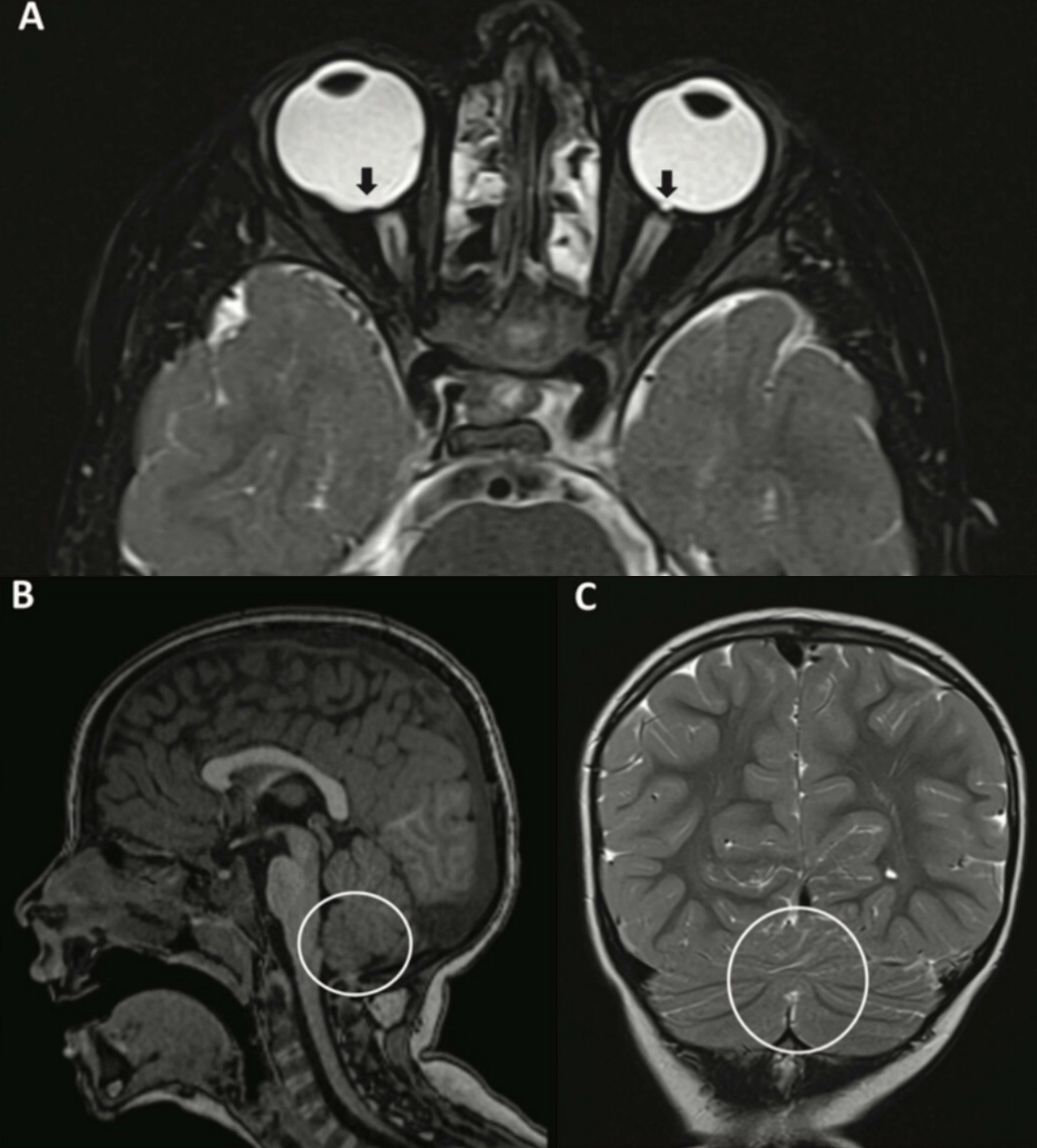
MR brain findings in a person with Beck–Fahrner syndrome: A. bilateral coloboma; B. underdeveloped inferior cerebellar vermis; C. mildly abnormal midline cerebellum surface.

The most common neurodevelopmental symptoms associated with Beck–Fahrner syndrome include a delay in global development, slow progress in mental and physical activities, delayed speech, and difficulties with fine and gross motor skills. Intellectual and learning disabilities are commonly present, and more than two-thirds of affected individuals have syndromic autism or social communication disorder. Additionally, attention deficit hyperactivity disorder, obsessive–compulsive tendencies, anxiety, depression and psychosis have been observed.

Decreased tone of muscles is most noticeable in early life, causing feeding difficulties and constipation in infants, and further impeding the development of speech and motor skills in children. Epilepsy and seizure disorders affect over one-third of individuals, while some individuals encounter motor and movement disorders. Eye involvement can lead to vision, movement and alignment issues, and ear involvement may result in hearing loss. Affected individuals may at times demonstrate benign brain malformations in neuroimaging studies.

Most individuals affected by Beck–Fahrner syndrome exhibit similar facial features, including a long face with a broad forehead, an open mouth appearance, protruding ears, arched eyebrows and a high-arched palate. Musculoskeletal abnormalities encompass kyphosis, scoliosis, hyperflexible joints, hip misalignment and flat feet. Overgrowth may manifest in some individuals, presenting with characteristics such as a larger head size and tall stature; rarely this may be correlated with enlarged kidneys and heart. Conversely, undergrowth has also been reported, associated with a smaller head size and short stature. Congenital heart defects, pyloric stenosis, inguinal hernia, hypospadias and undescended testis have been observed less frequently.

== Mechanism ==
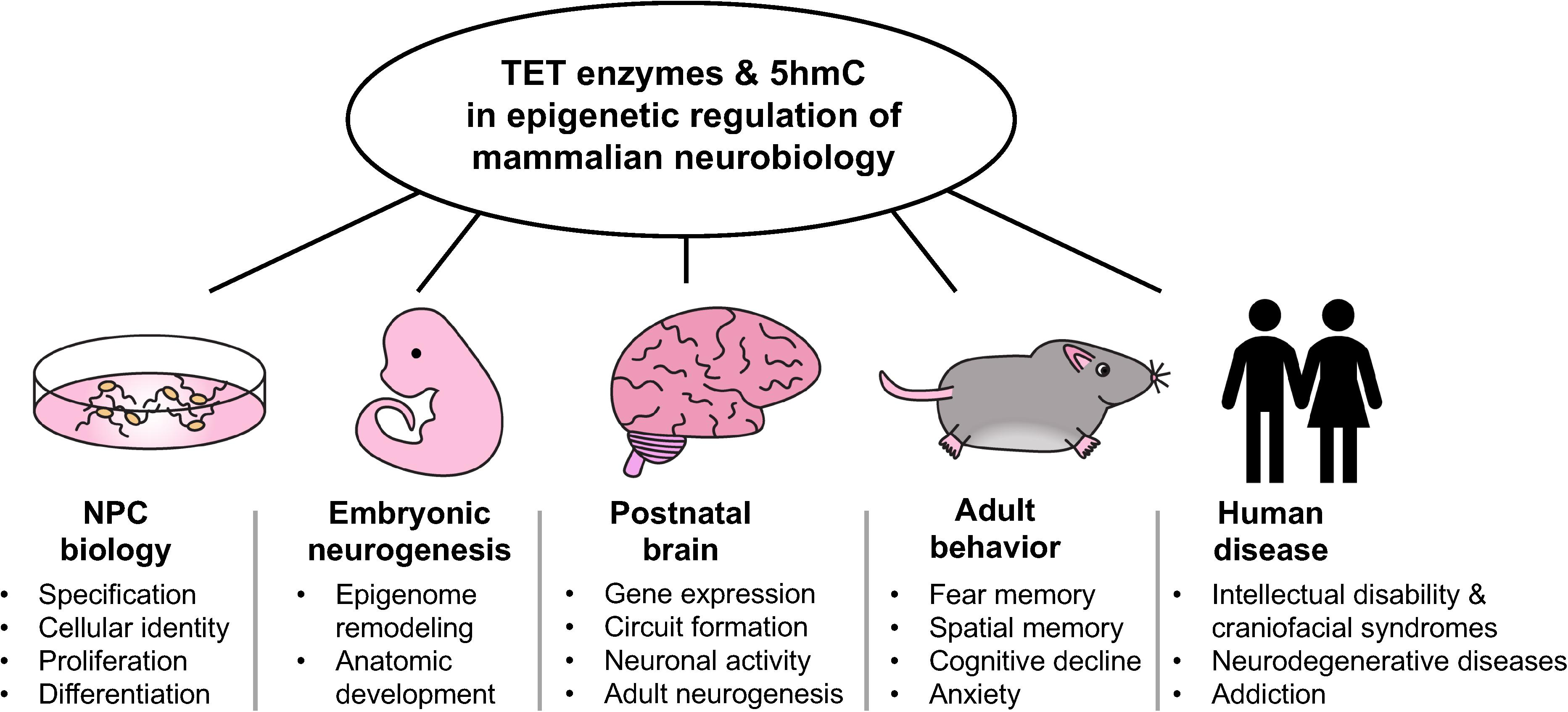
Summary of the role of TET enzymes and 5-hydroxymethylcytosine (5hmC) in mammalian neurobiology. Note: Neural progenitor cell (NPC)

The TET3 gene on chromosome 2 (2p13.1) encodes the tet methylcytosine dioxygenase 3 (TET3) enzyme. (Note: TET enzymes are a family of "ten-eleven translocation" methylcytosine dioxygenases that participate in DNA demethylation.) TET3 enzyme facilitates conversion of 5-methylcytosine (5mC) to 5-hydroxymethylcytosine (5hmC), initiating active DNA demethylation, an epigenetic mechanism. TET3 enzyme is produced in embryonic stem cells during embryogenesis, where it contributes to the development of the nervous system. It sustains neural stem cells and subsequently promotes the maturation of neurons.

Beck–Fahrner syndrome is caused by specific pathogenic or likely pathogenic variants in the TET3 gene. These variants can be heterozygous (one normal copy and one affected copy), compound heterozygous (two different affected copies), or homozygous (two identical affected copies). The variants—which can be of various types like nonsense, missense or frameshift—disrupt the normal DNA demethylation process during early embryonic development and the formation of the nervous system. This disruption leads to an elevation in methylated CpG sites, causing DNA hypermethylation.

The pathogenic variants can either occur due to new genetic changes during embryogenesis or be inherited in a way where one copy of the affected gene is sufficient to cause the condition – autosomal dominant. The signs and symptoms may vary among individuals due to differences in gene expression and partial loss of gene function.

== Diagnosis ==
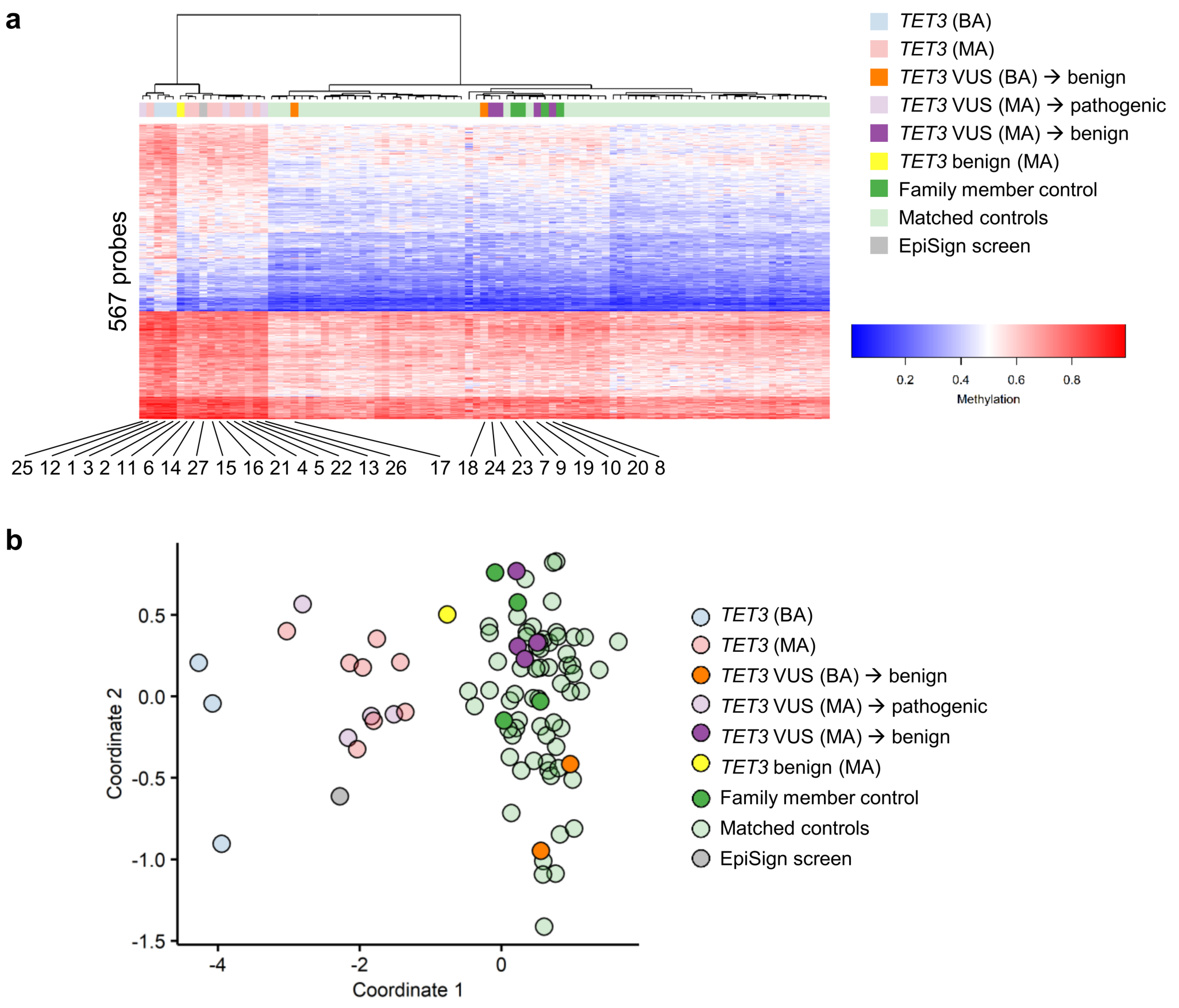
a. Each row represents a CpG probe (binding to each CpG site where DNA demethylation can occur), and each column represents an individual's sample. The color scale from blue to red indicates the DNA methylation level, ranging from 0 (no methylation) to 1 (fully methylated). The episignatures of pathogenic TET3 variants display DNA hypermethylation in comparison to matched and family controls. b. Multidimensional scaling was performed to stratify TET3 variants of uncertain significance (VUS) as either pathogenic or benign, based on their episignatures. Note: bi-allelic (BA); mono-allelic (MA)

Beck–Fahrner syndrome shares clinical findings with several genetic disorders. These include Bainbridge–Ropers syndrome, Fragile X syndrome, Heyn–Sproul–Jackson syndrome, Kabuki syndrome, Luscan-Lumish syndrome, Malan syndrome, Sotos syndrome and Tatton-Brown–Rahman syndrome. There is no consensus on diagnostic criteria for Beck–Fahrner syndrome. Diagnosis involves confirming the presence of a pathogenic or likely pathogenic TET3 gene variant in conjunction with identification of characteristic signs and symptoms.

Various molecular and genetic testing methods are employed to identify variants associated with Beck–Fahrner syndrome. These may include multigene panels incorporating the TET3 gene, whole genome sequencing, exome sequencing, sequence analysis, and single-gene testing followed by targeted gene deletion or duplication analysis. GeneReviews recommends exome sequencing as the preferred diagnostic test due to the recent identification of the condition and the limited availability of TET3 gene analysis on most multigene panels.

Levy et al. (2021) discovered a distinct DNA methylation pattern or epigenetic signature (episignature)—demonstrating DNA hypermethylation—unique to pathogenic and likely pathogenic TET3 gene variants. This episignature can be assessed through whole blood genome-wide DNA methylation analysis, and may serve as a tool to confirm the pathogenicity of a TET3 variant of uncertain significance.

== Management ==
The management approach for Beck–Fahrner syndrome is primarily supportive, with a focus on improving the quality of life. The care is coordinated by medical genetics and developmental pediatrics, involving a multidisciplinary team of specialists. Depending on specific symptoms, various medical specialists may be involved, including neurology for seizures and cardiology for heart defects. Early interventions, such as autism therapies and participation in special education programs like behavior therapy and speech therapy, can help manage developmental and cognitive issues. Physical and occupational therapy can support in addressing physical symptoms, and assistive technology such as mobility aid and standing frame can be utilized when necessary.

Genetic counseling plays a role in educating patients and their families about the condition, assessing the risk of other family members having the disorder, offering guidance on family planning, and providing information on prenatal testing. Furthermore, social work assists patients and families in exploring palliative, respite and nursing home care options when necessary.

== History ==
In 2018, a research paper suggested that pathogenic variants in the TET3 gene could cause intellectual disability. Beck–Fahrner syndrome, initially referred to as "TET3 deficiency", was first described in 2020 at the National Human Genome Research Institute and Johns Hopkins Hospital. It was the first human disorder of DNA demethylation to be delineated. As of 2023, approximately 50 individuals have been diagnosed with this condition.
