= DNA photoionization =

Physical-chemical process

DNA photoionization is the phenomenon according to which ultraviolet radiation absorbed directly by a DNA system (mononucleotide, single or double strand, G-quadruplex…) induces the ejection of electrons, leaving electron holes on the nucleic acid.

The loss of an electron gives rise to a radical cation on the DNA. Radical cations are precursors to oxidative damage, ultimately leading to carcinogenic mutations and cell death. This aspect, detrimental to the health, is exploited in the germicidal equipments using far-UVC lamps. The electric charges photogenarated in DNA could potentially find applications in optoelectronic devices.

Two properties are crucial regarding photoionization. On the one hand, the ionization energy (also called ionization potential, IP), refers to the energy necessary to remove one electron from a molecule; the lowest IP, corresponding to the ejection of a first electron, is the most biologically relevant factor. On the other hand, the photoionization quantum yield Φ, that is the number of electrons that are ejected over the number of absorbed photons; Φ depends on the irradiation wavelength.

The mechanism underlying DNA ionization depends on the number of photons that provoke the ejection of one electron (one-photon or multiphoton, induced by intense laser pulses). And, in the case of one-photon process, it differs according to the photon energy (high-energy or low-energy). While one- and two-photon ionization in condensed phase (aqueous solutions, cells…) is mainly studied in respect with the UV-induced oxidative damage, multiphoton ionization in the gas phase, often coupled to mass spectroscopy, is used in various techniques in order to obtain broader spectroscopic, analytical, structural or therapeutic information.

== Ionization potentials ==
Since the end of the 20th century, numerous theoretical studies, performed using various types of quantum chemistry methods, focus on the computation of the lowest IP of nucleobases. Particular effort is being dedicated to evaluate environmental effects, such as the presence of water molecules, base-pairing, base stacking or base-sequence. All these studies agree that the IP decreases in the order: thymine, cytosine, adenine, guanine.

Experimentally, IPs are determined by photoelectron spectroscopy. A series of systematic measurements of all the elementary DNA components as well as of genomic DNA in liquid jets, associated with computations, provided important information regarding the ionization in aqueous media. The IP values measured for nucleosides/nucleotides (8.1, 8.1, 7.6 and 7.3 eV for thymidine monophosphate, cytosine, adenosine and guanosine, respectively) match those computed for vertical ionization. The latter corresponds to electron ejection without prior geometrical rearrangement of the molecular framework. Most importantly, it was evidenced that base-pairing and base-stacking do not have any significant effect.

== One photon ionization ==
=== Photoionization quantum yields ===
Photoionization quantum yields are determined for DNA in aqueous solution by means of the transient absorption spectroscopy using as excitation source nanosecond laser pulses. The ejected electrons are solvated by the water molecules (hydrated) on the sub-picosecond time scale. As the absorption spectrum of hydrated electrons, peaking 720 nm, is well known, they can be characterized in a quantitative way.

=== High-energy photoionization ===
The first experiments were reported in the 1990s using excitation at 193 nm. The quantum yields determined for the nucleobases at this wavelength amount to a few percent. Τhe Φ found for genomic DNA is the linear combination of the quantum yield values of the individual nucleobases, in agreement with the findings of the photoelectron spectroscopy.

=== Low-energy photoionization ===
The first studies on low-energy photoionization, occurring at wavelengths for which the photon energy is significantly smaller compared to the lowest ionization potential of DNA, were reported back in 2005 (G-Quadruplexes at 308 nm) and 2006 (single and double strands at 266 nm). But this unexpected phenomenon started to be studied in a systematic way only ten years later. To that effect, specific protocols regarding the purity of the nucleic acids and the ingredients of the aqueous solution as well as the intensity of the exciting laser pulses were established.

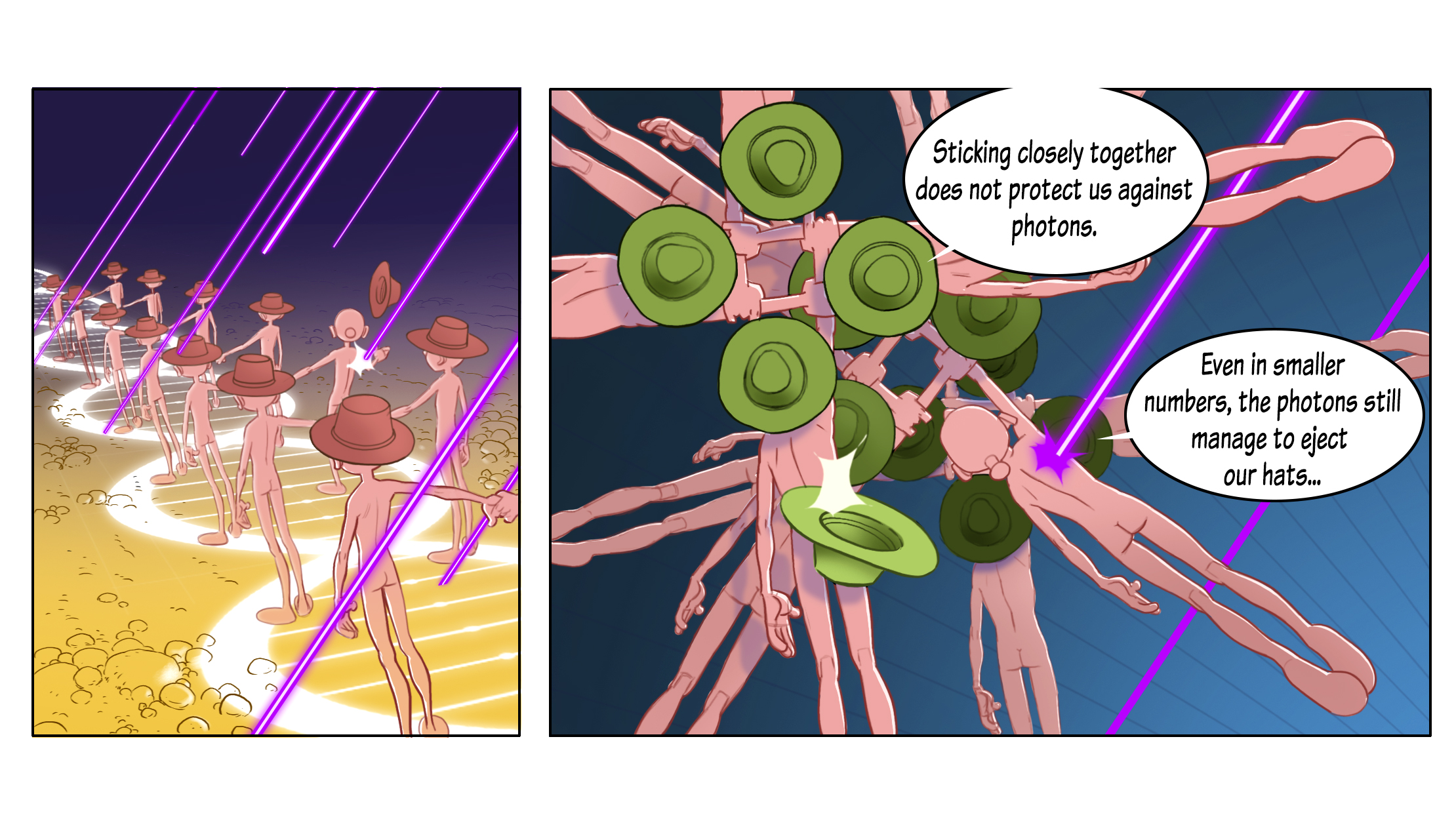
Cartoon on low-energy photoionization. Electron (hat) photo-ejection is more efficient in G-Quadruplexes than in duplexes. (European e-knownet project.)

In contrast to the high-energy, low-energy photoionization strongly depends on the secondary DNA structure. It is not observed for mononucleosides, mononucleotides or purely stacked single strands (Φ < 0.5 × 10^{−4}). The quantum yields determined for duplexes fall in the range of (1-2) × 10^{−3} while the highest Φ values, up to 1.4 × 10^{−2}, have been detected for G-Quadruplexes. The photonization quantum yield determined for genomic DNA is similar to that reported for the formation of bipyrimidine photoproducts.

The detailed examination of the structural factors affecting the low-energy photoionization, combined to quantum chemical calculations, indicates that it occurs via a complex mechanism. The latter involves excited charge transfer states, in which an atomic charge is transferred from one nucleobase to a neighboring one; such states are known to be populated during the electronic relaxation following photon absorption. Subsequently, a small population of these states undergoes charge separation. And, eventually, the electron is ejected from the nucleobase bearing the negative charge, because its ionization potential is lower compared to those of neutral nucleobases.

== Two-photon ionization ==
Two-photon photoionization is provoked by intense laser pulses of short duration. In this case, a first photon absorbed by DNA gives rise to an electronic excited state. During its lifetime, the latter may absorb a second photon. The electron is then ejected from this excited state and not from the ground state, as happens for the one-photon ionization. This ionization mode started to be used already from the 1980sin order to characterize chemically the final DNA lesions (single and double strand breaks, 8-oxo-7,8-dihydroguanine,..), stemming from this process. Typically, lasers emitting at 248 or 266 nm have been employed in combination to analytical or biochemical methods. Such measurements are performed both on DNA solutions and on cells.

The need to correlate the observed lesions with the ejected electrons lead to first time-resolved absorption studies on the process triggered by absorption of UV radiation directly by DNA. Thus, signatures of the nucleobase radicals were discovered either in the UV-visible spectral domain or in the infrared.
