= Guanosine phosphorylase =

Class of enzymes

Identifiers
- EC no.: 2.4.2.15
- CAS no.: 9030-28-8

Databases
- IntEnz: IntEnz view
- BRENDA: BRENDA entry
- ExPASy: NiceZyme view
- KEGG: KEGG entry
- MetaCyc: metabolic pathway
- PRIAM: profile
- PDB structures: RCSB PDB PDBe PDBsum
- Gene Ontology: AmiGO / QuickGO
Search
- PMC: articles
- PubMed: articles
- NCBI: proteins

Guanosine phosphorylase (EC 2.4.2.15) is an enzyme that catalyzes a reversible phosphorolysis reaction

guanosine
P_{i}
P_{i}
α-D-ribose 1-phosphate
+
guanine

In the forward direction shown, the two substrates of the enzyme characterised from Escherichia coli are guanosine and orthophosphate (P_{i}). Its products are α-D-ribose 1-phosphate and guanine. It has also been found in rabbit.

This enzyme belongs to the family of glycosyltransferases, specifically the pentosyltransferases. The systematic name of this enzyme class is guanosine:phosphate alpha-D-ribosyltransferase.
