= 27S pre-rRNA (guanosine2922-2'-O)-methyltransferase =

Class of enzymes

27S pre-rRNA (guanosine^{2922}-2'-O)-methyltransferase

Identifiers
- EC no.: 2.1.1.167

Databases
- IntEnz: IntEnz view
- BRENDA: BRENDA entry
- ExPASy: NiceZyme view
- KEGG: KEGG entry
- MetaCyc: metabolic pathway
- PRIAM: profile
- PDB structures: RCSB PDB PDBe PDBsum
Search
- PMC: articles
- PubMed: articles
- NCBI: proteins

27S pre-rRNA (guanosine^{2922}-2'-O)-methyltransferase (EC 2.1.1.167, Spb1p (gene), YCL054W (gene)) is an enzyme with systematic name S-adenosyl-L-methionine:27S pre-rRNA (guanosine^{2922}-2'-O-)-methyltransferase. This enzyme catalyses the following chemical reaction

S-adenosyl-L-methionine + guanosine^{2922} in 27S pre-rRNA $\rightleftharpoons$ S-adenosyl-L-homocysteine + 2'-O-methylguanosine^{2922} in 27S pre-rRNA

Spb1p is a site-specific 2'-O-ribose RNA methyltransferase that catalyses the formation of 2'-O-methylguanosine2922.
