= Deoxyguanosine =

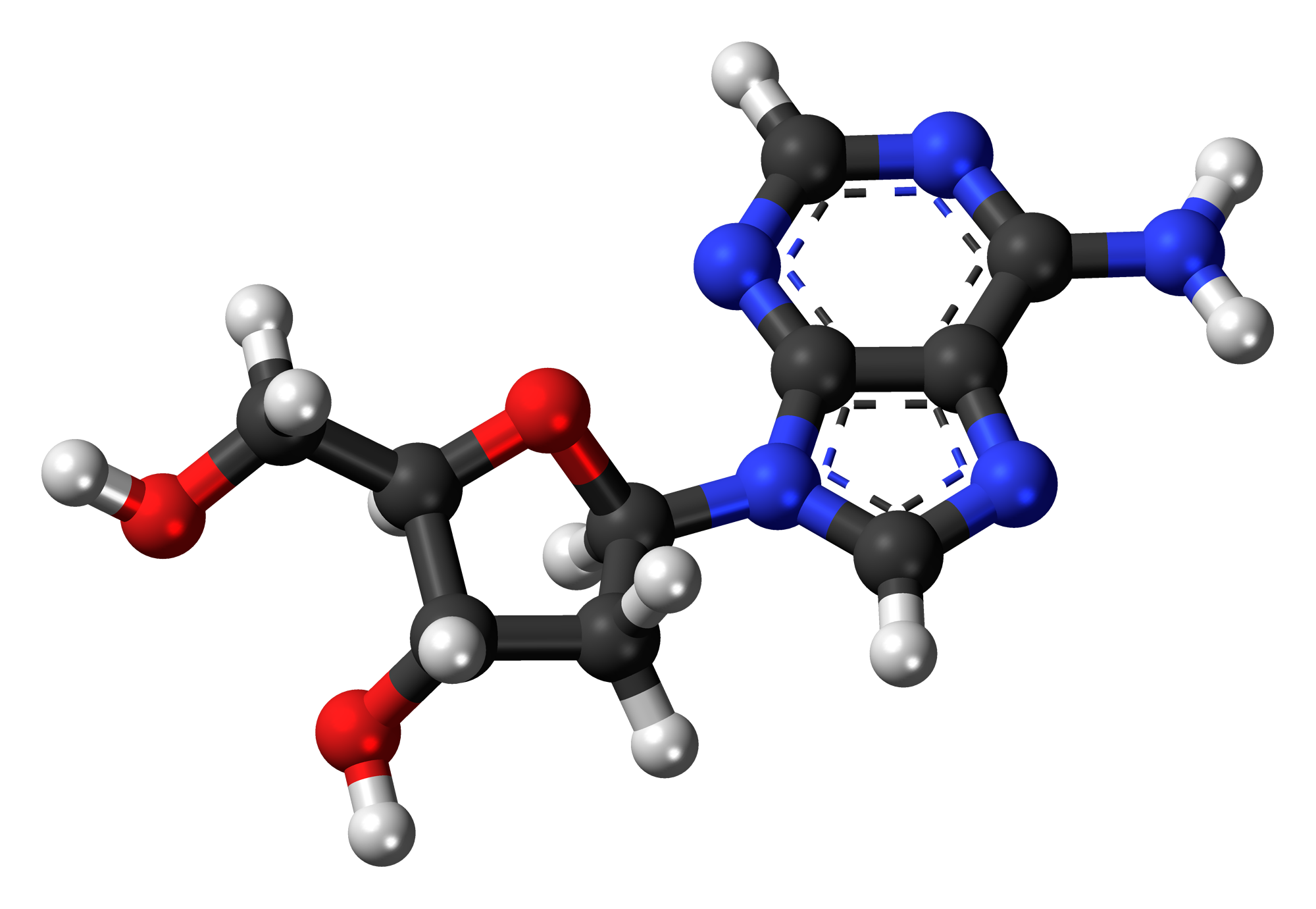

Names
- IUPAC name 2-Amino-9-[(2R,4S,5R)-4-hydroxy-5-(hydroxymethyl)oxolan-2-yl]-3H-purin-6-one

Identifiers
CAS Number	961-07-9
3D model (JSmol)	Interactive image
ChEBI	CHEBI:17172
ChEMBL	ChEMBL68908
ChemSpider	163230
ECHA InfoCard	100.012.278
MeSH	Deoxyguanosine
PubChem CID	638
UNII	G9481N71RO
CompTox Dashboard (EPA)	DTXSID30883626
- InChI: InChI=1S/C10H13N5O4/c11-10-13-8-7(9(18)14-10)12-3-15(8)6-1-4(17)5(2-16)19-6/h3-6,16-17H,1-2H2,(H3,11,13,14,18)/t4-,5+,6+/m0/s1 Key: YKBGVTZYEHREMT-KVQBGUIXSA-N; InChI=1/C10H13N5O4/c11-10-13-8-7(9(18)14-10)12-3-15(8)6-1-4(17)5(2-16)19-6/h3-6,16-17H,1-2H2,(H3,11,13,14,18)/t4-,5+,6+/m0/s1 Key: YKBGVTZYEHREMT-KVQBGUIXBI
- SMILES: c1nc2c(n1[C@H]3C[C@@H]([C@H](O3)CO)O)[nH]c(nc2=O)N

Properties
Chemical formula	C_{10}H_{13}N_{5}O_{4}
Molar mass	267.245 g·mol^{−1}
Melting point	250 °C (482 °F; 523 K)
- Except where otherwise noted, data are given for materials in their standard state (at 25 °C [77 °F], 100 kPa). verify (what is ?) Infobox references

Deoxyguanosine (dG) is composed of the purine nucleobase guanine linked by its N9 nitrogen to the C1 carbon of deoxyribose. It is similar to guanosine, but with one hydroxyl group removed from the 2' position of the ribose sugar (making it deoxyribose). If a phosphate group is attached at the 5' position, it becomes deoxyguanosine monophosphate.

Deoxyguanosine is one of the four deoxyribonucleosides that make up DNA.

== Potential Damage to Deoxyguanosine ==
Deoxyguanosine is a base that is vulnerable to reactive oxygen species (ROS) because of its comparatively lower oxidation potential. As a result, ROS can oxidize dG to make 8-oxo-7,8-dihydro-2'-deoxyguanosine (8-oxodG). This modification is known as a pre-mutagenic lesion, meaning that the damage can still be repaired, but can lead to a mutation if left alone. The oxidation of dG can be detrimental to the genome since 8-oxodG base pairs with deoxyadenosine (dA) instead of the deoxycytidine (dC), which is the proper Watson-Crick base pair. Consequently, if the lesion is not repaired via the mismatch repair mechanism, during DNA replication a dA will take the place of the dC, resulting in a mutation.

Deoxyguanosine is also a base that is prone to reacting with carcinogens, such as polyaromatic hydrocarbons (PAHs). Once the PAHs are metabolized and made stable in the intracellular environment, they can react with dG to form 7-methyldeoxyguanosine or O6-methyldeoxyguanosine. The presence of these modifications can then lead to downstream effects that lower the fidelity of DNA replication and potentially cause mutations.

== See also ==
- 8-Oxo-2'-deoxyguanosine
