= S-Adenozilmetionin:tRNA ribosyltransferase-isomerase =

Class of enzymes

S-Adenosylmethionine:tRNA ribosyltransferase-isomerase

Identifiers
- EC no.: 2.4.99.17

Databases
- IntEnz: IntEnz view
- BRENDA: BRENDA entry
- ExPASy: NiceZyme view
- KEGG: KEGG entry
- MetaCyc: metabolic pathway
- PRIAM: profile
- PDB structures: RCSB PDB PDBe PDBsum
Search
- PMC: articles
- PubMed: articles
- NCBI: proteins

S-Adenosylmethionine:tRNA ribosyltransferase-isomerase (EC 2.4.99.17, QueA enzyme, queuosine biosynthesis protein QueA) is an enzyme with systematic name S-adenosyl-L-methionine:7-aminomethyl-7-deazaguanosine ribosyltransferase (ribosyl isomerizing; L-methionine, adenine releasing). This enzyme catalyses the following chemical reaction

S-adenosyl-L-methionine + 7-aminomethyl-7-carbaguanosine^{34} in tRNA $\rightleftharpoons$ L-methionine + adenine + epoxyqueuosine^{34} in tRNA

The reaction is a combined transfer and isomerization of the ribose moiety of S-adenosyl-L-methionine to the modified guanosine base in the wobble position in tRNAs specific for Tyr, His, Asp or Asn.
