= 8-Oxo-2'-deoxyguanosine =

Names
- IUPAC name 2-amino-9-[(2R,4S,5R)-4-hydroxy-5-(hydroxymethyl)oxolan-2-yl]-3,7-dihydropurine-6,8-dione
- Other names 7,8-Dihydro-8-oxo-2'-deoxyguanosine; 7,8-Dihydro-8-oxodeoxyguanosine; 8-Hydroxy-2'-deoxyguanosine; 8-Hydroxydeoxyguanosine; 8-Oxo-2'-deoxyguanosine; 8-Oxo-7,8-dihydro-2'-deoxyguanosine; 8-Oxo-7,8-dihydrodeoxyguanosine; 8-Oxo-dG; 8-OH-dG

Identifiers
| CAS Number | 88847-89-6 |
| 3D model (JSmol) | Interactive image; Interactive image |
| ChEBI | CHEBI:40304 |
| ChemSpider | 66049 |
| PubChem CID | 73318 |
| UNII | 4RGB38T3IB |
| CompTox Dashboard (EPA) | DTXSID60904338 |
- InChI: InChI=1S/C10H13N5O5/c11-9-13-7-6(8(18)14-9)12-10(19)15(7)5-1-3(17)4(2-16)20-5/h3-5,16-17H,1-2H2,(H,12,19)(H3,11,13,14,18)/t3-,4+,5+/m0/s1 Key: HCAJQHYUCKICQH-VPENINKCSA-N; InChI=1/C10H13N5O5/c11-9-13-7-6(8(18)14-9)12-10(19)15(7)5-1-3(17)4(2-16)20-5/h3-5,16-17H,1-2H2,(H,12,19)(H3,11,13,14,18)/t3-,4+,5+/m0/s1 Key: HCAJQHYUCKICQH-VPENINKCBS
- SMILES: C1[C@@H]([C@H](O[C@H]1N2C3=C(C(=O)N=C(N3)N)NC2=O)CO)O; C1[C@@H]([C@H](O[C@H]1n2c3c(c(=O)nc([nH]3)N)[nH]c2=O)CO)O

Properties
| Chemical formula | C_{10}H_{13}N_{5}O_{5} |
| Molar mass | 283.24 g/mol |
- Except where otherwise noted, data are given for materials in their standard state (at 25 °C [77 °F], 100 kPa). verify (what is ?) Infobox references

8-Oxo-2'-deoxyguanosine (8-oxo-dG) is an oxidized derivative of deoxyguanosine. 8-Oxo-dG is one of the major products of DNA oxidation. Concentrations of 8-oxo-dG within a cell are a measurement of oxidative stress.

== In DNA ==
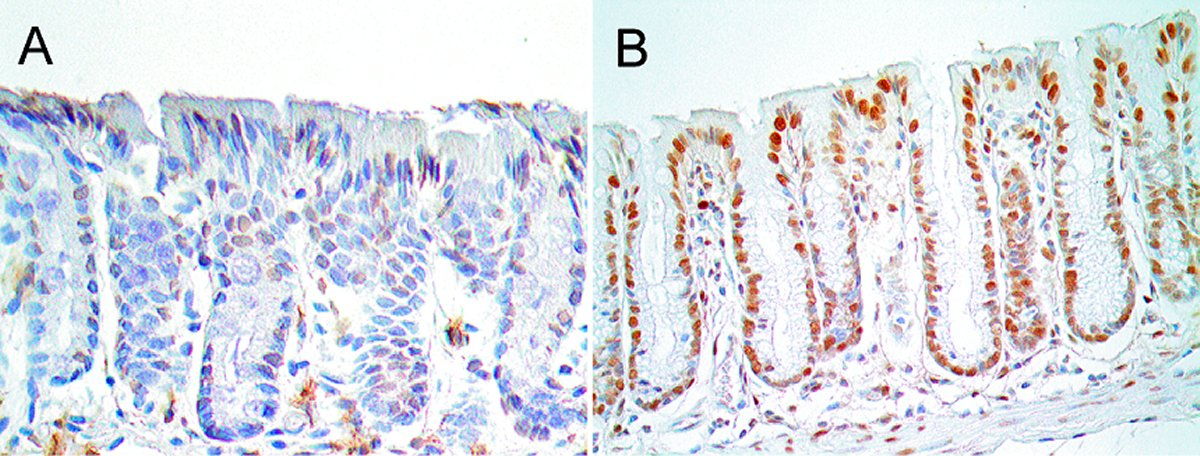
Colonic epithelium from a mouse not undergoing colonic tumorigenesis (A), and a mouse that is undergoing colonic tumorigenesis (B). Cell nuclei are stained dark blue with hematoxylin (for nucleic acid) and immunostained brown for 8-oxo-dG. The level of 8-oxo-dG was graded in the nuclei of colonic crypt cells on a scale of 0-4. Mice not undergoing tumorigenesis had crypt 8-oxo-dG at levels 0 to 2 (panel A shows level 1) while mice progressing to colonic tumors had 8-oxo-dG in colonic crypts at levels 3 to 4 (panel B shows level 4) Tumorigenesis was induced by adding deoxycholate to the mouse diet to give a level of deoxycholate in the mouse colon similar to the level in the colon of humans on a high fat diet. The images were made from original photomicrographs.

Steady-state levels of DNA damages represent the balance between formation and repair. Swenberg et al. measured average frequencies of steady state endogenous DNA damages in mammalian cells. The most frequent oxidative DNA damage normally present in DNA is 8-oxo-dG, occurring at an average frequency of 2,400 per cell.

When 8-oxo-dG is induced by a DNA damaging agent it is rapidly repaired. For example, 8-oxo-dG was increased 10-fold in the livers of mice subjected to ionizing radiation, but the excess 8-oxo-dG was rapidly removed with a half-life of 11 minutes.

As reviewed by Valavanidis et al. increased levels of 8-oxo-dG in a tissue can serve as a biomarker of oxidative stress. They also noted that increased levels of 8-oxo-dG are frequently found during carcinogenesis.

In the figure shown in this section, the colonic epithelium from a mouse on a normal diet has a low level of 8-oxo-dG in its colonic crypts (panel A). However, a mouse likely undergoing colonic tumorigenesis (due to deoxycholate added to its diet) has a high level of 8-oxo-dG in its colonic epithelium (panel B). Deoxycholate increases intracellular production of reactive oxygen resulting in increased oxidative stress, and this leads to tumorigenesis and carcinogenesis. Of 22 mice fed the diet supplemented with deoxycholate, 20 (91%) developed colonic tumors after 10 months on the diet, and the tumors in 10 of these mice (45% of mice) included an adenocarcinoma (cancer).

== In aging ==
8-oxo-dG increases with age in DNA of mammalian tissues. 8-oxo-dG increases in both mitochondrial DNA and nuclear DNA with age. Fraga et al. estimated that in rat kidney, for every 54 residues of 8-oxo-dG repaired, one residue remains unrepaired. (See also DNA damage theory of aging.)

== In carcinogenesis ==
Increased oxidant stress inactivates temporarily the enzyme OGG1 (Oxoguanine glycosylase) at sites with 8-oxo-dG, which recruits transcription factor NFkB to the promoter DNA sequences of inflammatory genes, and activates gene expression, inducing mechanisms of innate immunity that contribute to lung carcinogenesis.

Valavanidis et al. pointed out that oxidative DNA damage, such as 8-oxo-dG, likely contributes to carcinogenesis by two mechanisms. The first mechanism involves modulation of gene expression, whereas the second is through the induction of mutations.

In individuals with chronic hepatitis C virus infection, increased expression of 8-oxo-dG is a risk factor for the development of hepatocellular carcinoma.

=== Epigenetic alterations ===
Epigenetic alteration, for instance by methylation of CpG islands in a promoter region of a gene, can repress expression of the gene (see DNA methylation). In general, epigenetic alteration can modulate gene expression. As reviewed by Bernstein and Bernstein, the repair of various types of DNA damages can, with low frequency, leave remnants of the different repair processes and thereby cause epigenetic alterations. 8-Oxo-dG is primarily repaired by base excision repair (BER). Li et al. reviewed studies indicating that one or more BER proteins also participate(s) in epigenetic alterations involving DNA methylation, demethylation or reactions coupled to histone modification. Nishida et al. examined 8-oxo-dG levels and also evaluated promoter methylation of 11 tumor suppressor genes (TSGs) in 128 liver biopsy samples. These biopsies were taken from patients with chronic hepatitis C, a condition causing oxidative damages in the liver. Among 5 factors evaluated, only increased levels of 8-oxo-dG was highly correlated with promoter methylation of TSGs (p<0.0001). This promoter methylation could have reduced expression of these tumor suppressor genes and contributed to carcinogenesis.

=== Mutagenesis ===
Yasui et al. examined the fate of 8-oxo-dG when this oxidized derivative of deoxyguanosine was inserted into the thymidine kinase gene in a chromosome within human lymphoblastoid cells in culture. They inserted 8-oxo-dG into about 800 cells, and could detect the products that occurred after the insertion of this altered base, as determined from the clones produced after growth of the cells. 8-Oxo-dG was restored to G in 86% of the clones, probably reflecting accurate base excision repair or translesion synthesis without mutation. G:C to T:A transversions occurred in 5.9% of the clones, single base deletions in 2.1% and G:C to C:G transversions in 1.2%. Together, these more common mutations totaled 9.2% of the 14% of mutations generated at the site of the 8-oxo-dG insertion. Among the other mutations in the 800 clones analyzed, there were also 3 larger deletions, of sizes 6, 33 and 135 base pairs. Thus 8-oxo-dG, if not repaired, can directly cause frequent mutations, some of which may contribute to carcinogenesis.

== In memory formation ==
Two reviews summarize the large body of evidence, reported largely between 1996 and 2011, for the critical and essential role of ROS in memory formation. A recent additional body of evidence indicates that both the formation and storage of memory depend on epigenetic modifications in neurons, including alterations in neuronal DNA methylation. The two bodies of information on memory formation appear to be connected in 2016 by the work of Zhou et al, who showed that 8-oxo-dG, a major product of ROS interaction with DNA, has a central role in epigenetic DNA demethylation.

The activation of transcription of some genes by transcription factors depends on the presence of 8-oxo-dG in the promoter regions and its recognition by the DNA repair glycosylase OGG1.

As reviewed by Duke et al., neuron DNA methylation and demethylation are altered by neuronal activity. Active DNA methylations and demethylations are required for synaptic plasticity, are modified by experiences, and are required for memory formation and maintenance.

In mammals, DNA methyltransferases (which add methyl groups to DNA bases) exhibit a strong sequence preference for cytosines within the particular DNA sequence cytosine-phosphate-guanine (CpG sites). In the mouse brain, 4.2% of all cytosines are methylated, primarily in the context of CpG sites, forming 5mCpG. Most hypermethylated 5mCpG sites increase the repression of associated genes. As shown by Zhou et al., and illustrated below, oxidation of the guanine in the methylated CpG site, to form 5mCp-8-oxo-dG is the first step in demethylation.

8-oxo-dG complexed with OGG1 likely has a major role in facilitating thousands of rapid demethylations of methylated cytosines in CpG sites during formation of memory and further demethylations (over a period of weeks) during memory consolidation. As shown in 2016 by Halder et al. using mice, and in 2017 by Duke et al. using rats, when contextual fear conditioning is applied to the rodents, causing an especially strong long-term memory to form, within hours there are thousands of methylations and demethylations in the hippocampus brain region neurons. As shown with the rats, 9.2% of the genes in the rat hippocampus neurons are differentially methylated. In mice, examined at 4 weeks after conditioning, the hippocampus methylations and demethylations were reversed (the hippocampus is needed to form memories but memories are not stored there) while substantial differential CpG methylation and demethylation occurred in cortical neurons during memory maintenance. There were 1,223 differentially methylated genes in the anterior cingulate cortex of mice four weeks after contextual fear conditioning. Where demethylations occur, oxidation of the guanine in the CpG site to form 8-oxo-dG is an important first step.

=== Demethylation at CpG sites requires 8-oxo-dG ===
Initiation of DNA demethylation at a CpG site. In adult somatic cells DNA methylation typically occurs in the context of CpG dinucleotides (CpG sites), forming 5-methylcytosine-pG, or 5mCpG. Reactive oxygen species (ROS) may attack guanine at the dinucleotide site, forming 8-hydroxy-2'-deoxyguanosine (8-OHdG), and resulting in a 5mCp-8-OHdG dinucleotide site. The base excision repair enzyme OGG1 targets 8-OHdG and binds to the lesion without immediate excision. OGG1, present at a 5mCp-8-OHdG site recruits TET1 and TET1 oxidizes the 5mC adjacent to the 8-OHdG. This initiates demethylation of 5mC.

Demethylation of 5-Methylcytosine (5mC) in neuron DNA. As reviewed in 2018, in brain neurons, 5mC is oxidized by the ten-eleven translocation (TET) family of dioxygenases (TET1, TET2, TET3) to generate 5-hydroxymethylcytosine (5hmC). In successive steps TET enzymes further hydroxylate 5hmC to generate 5-formylcytosine (5fC) and 5-carboxylcytosine (5caC). Thymine-DNA glycosylase (TDG) recognizes the intermediate bases 5fC and 5caC and excises the glycosidic bond resulting in an apyrimidinic site (AP site). In an alternative oxidative deamination pathway, 5hmC can be oxidatively deaminated by activity-induced cytidine deaminase/apolipoprotein B mRNA editing complex (AID/APOBEC) deaminases to form 5-hydroxymethyluracil (5hmU) or 5mC can be converted to thymine (Thy). 5hmU can be cleaved by TDG, single-strand-selective monofunctional uracil-DNA glycosylase 1 (SMUG1), Nei-Like DNA Glycosylase 1 (NEIL1), or methyl-CpG binding protein 4 (MBD4). AP sites and T:G mismatches are then repaired by base excision repair (BER) enzymes to yield cytosine (Cyt).

TET1 is a key enzyme involved in demethylating 5mCpG. However, TET1 is only able to act on 5mCpG if an ROS has first acted on the guanine to form 8-hydroxy-2'-deoxyguanosine (8-OHdG or its tautomer 8-oxo-dG), resulting in a 5mCp-8-OHdG dinucleotide (see first figure in this section). After formation of 5mCp-8-OHdG, the base excision repair enzyme OGG1 binds to the 8-OHdG lesion without immediate excision. Adherence of OGG1 to the 5mCp-8-OHdG site recruits TET1, allowing TET1 to oxidize the 5mC adjacent to 8-OHdG, as shown in the first figure in this section. This initiates the demethylation pathway shown in the second figure in this section.

Altered protein expression in neurons, controlled by 8-oxo-dG-dependent demethylation of CpG sites in gene promoters within neuron DNA, is central to memory formation.

== Measurement approaches ==
8-oxo-dG can be mapped at single-nucleotide resolution in the human genomes via click-code-seq, nanopore and CLAPS-seq.

== See also ==
- 8-Oxoguanosine
- Cancer research
