= 8-Hydroxyguanosine =

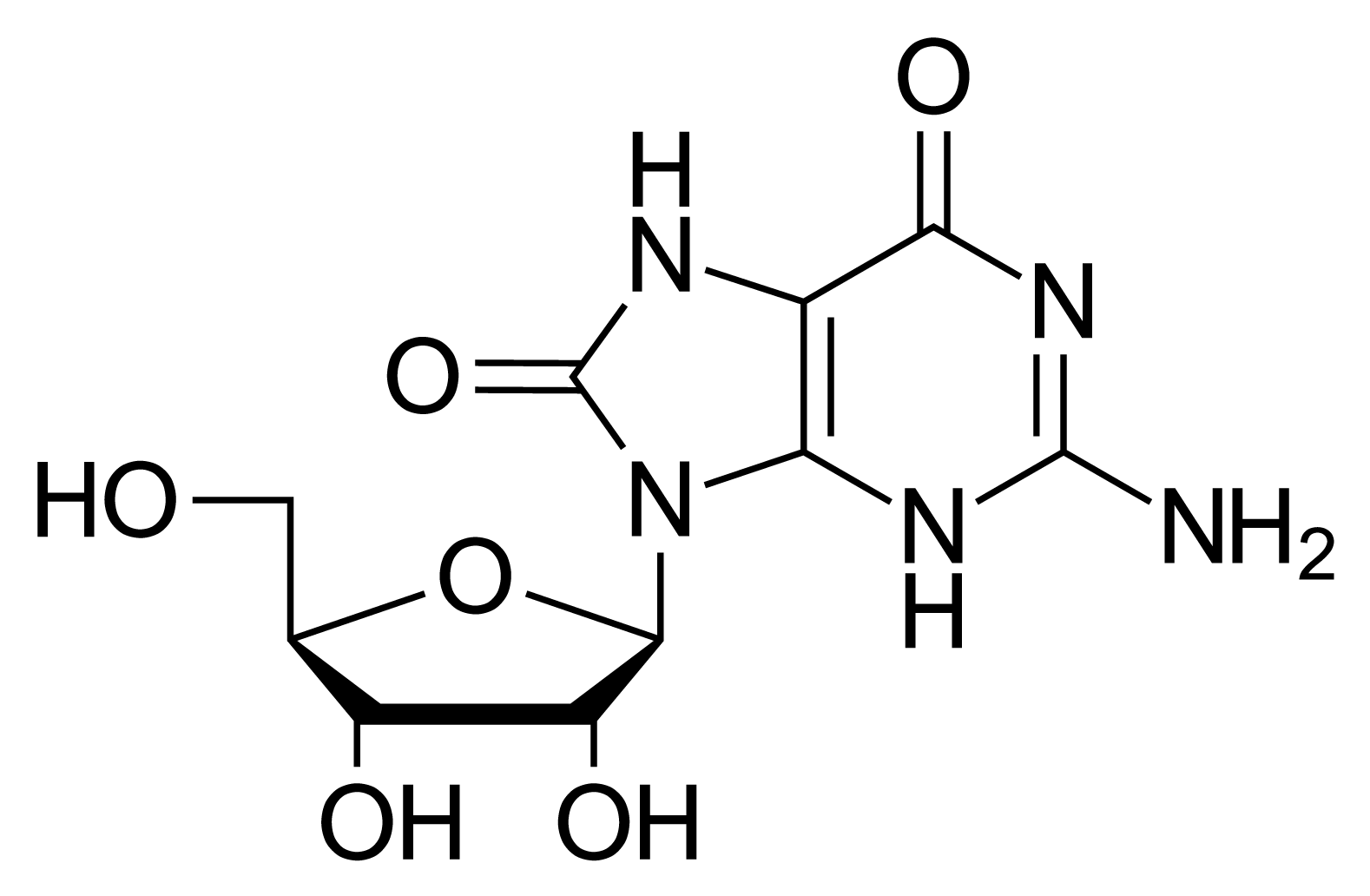

Names
- IUPAC name 2-Amino-9-[(2R,3R,4S,5R)-3,4-dihydroxy-5-(hydroxymethyl)-2-tetrahydrofuranyl]-3,7-dihydropurine-6,8-dione
- Other names 8-Oxoguanosine, 8-OHG, 8-oxo-G

Identifiers
CAS Number	3868-31-3
3D model (JSmol)	Interactive image; Interactive image
ChEMBL	ChEMBL1688964
ChemSpider	228049
ECHA InfoCard	100.162.784
PubChem CID	65131
CompTox Dashboard (EPA)	DTXSID50959514
- InChI: InChI=1S/C10H13N5O6/c11-9-13-6-3(7(19)14-9)12-10(20)15(6)8-5(18)4(17)2(1-16)21-8/h2,4-5,8,16-18H,1H2,(H,12,20)(H3,11,13,14,19) Key: FPGSEBKFEJEOSA-UHFFFAOYSA-N; InChI=1/C10H13N5O6/c11-9-13-6-3(7(19)14-9)12-10(20)15(6)8-5(18)4(17)2(1-16)21-8/h2,4-5,8,16-18H,1H2,(H,12,20)(H3,11,13,14,19) Key: FPGSEBKFEJEOSA-UHFFFAOYAG
- SMILES: C(C1C(C(C(O1)N2C3=C(C(=O)N=C(N3)N)NC2=O)O)O)O; O=C3/N=C(/N)NC\1=C3\NC(=O)N/1C2OC(C(O)C2O)CO

Properties
Chemical formula	C_{10}H_{13}N_{5}O_{6}
Molar mass	299.24 g/mol
- Except where otherwise noted, data are given for materials in their standard state (at 25 °C [77 °F], 100 kPa). verify (what is ?) Infobox references

8-Hydroxyguanosine (8-OHG) is an RNA nucleoside which is an oxidative derivative of guanosine. The incorporation of oxidized bases is typically detrimental to the cell, but the cell has developed ways to prevent the incorporation of oxidized RNA. Measurement of the levels of 8-hydroxyguanosine is used as a biomarker of oxidative stress causing RNA damage. Elevated levels of 8-OHG can be detected in tissue samples and serve as biomarkers to be used for early screening for disease.

== Biosynthesis and Biological Consequences ==
Reactive oxygen species (ROS) induce oxidative damage to cellular RNA, leading to the formation of 8-hydroxyguanosine (8-OHG). Under conditions of high oxidative stress, cells accumulate higher levels of 8-OHG in RNA than 8-oxo-dG in DNA. This difference could be due to several structural and environmental factors. Unlike DNA, RNA is predominately single-stranded which lacks the protection of additional hydrogen bonds. Furthermore, a large portion of cellular RNA is proximal to the mitochondria, exposing it to the cell's primary source of ROS. RNA's tendency to associate with Fe^{2+} ions also increases the vulnerability of the RNA to oxidative damage. The iron while bound to RNA, interacts with hydrogen peroxide (H_{2}O_{2}) through Fenton chemistry, and generates free radicals, driving the oxidation of RNA. Aside from the direct oxidation of RNA by ROS, 8-OHG can also be formed through the incorporation of oxidized ribonucleotides by RNA polymerase during transcription. This accumulation of 8-OHG disrupts cellular functions by interfering with and decreasing protein synthesis. The presence of 8-OHG in the mRNA transcript also compromises translational fidelity as 8-OHG can base-pair with adenine and cytosine, leading to the incorporation of the wrong amino acid in the growing polypeptide chain. Furthermore, the incorporation of oxidized bases in mRNA tends to stall at the ribosome, decreasing protein production and may also lead to defective protein aggregates.

To prevent extensive damage from oxidative ribonucleotides, cells have adapted ways to mitigate the deleterious effects. During transcription, the RNA polymerase naturally incorporates 8-OH-GTP at a substantially lower rate compared to its normal counterpart without oxidative damage. Furthermore, enzymes in bacteria such as MutT readily hydrolyze 8-OH-GTP into 8-oxo-GMP, which decreases the chances of it being incorporated in RNA. If an oxidized base gets incorporated into the RNA, the cell switches function from translation to degradation using specific proteins like PNPase, YB-1, and HNRNPD that bind and sequester the damaged RNA. While preventative measures are well-documented, the existence of an actual repair system for oxidized RNA remains unresolved.

== Biomarker ==
During oxidative stress, 8-OHG is produced in high amounts which serves as a biomarker for oxidative damage. Since 8-OHG is also rapidly turned over in the body, this allows 8-OHG to serve as a "steady-state" biomarker, allowing a glimpse into the extent of oxidative damage at the current time point. Patients with colorectal cancer tend to exhibit higher levels of 8-OHG in urine. In addition to cancer, 8-OHG is also seen in high levels in aging patient, cardiovascular disease, type 2 diabetes, and neurodegenerative diseases including Alzheimer's disease and Parkinson's disease. Therefore, the detection of 8-OHG in urine may serve as a non-invasive biomarker for early disease detection.

== See also ==
- 8-Oxo-2'-deoxyguanosine
