= Guanine radical cation =

Identifiers
3D model (JSmol)	Interactive image
ChemSpider	3037560
PubChem CID	136111026
- InChI: InChI=1S/C5H5N5O/c6-5-9-3-2(4(11)10-5)7-1-8-3/h1H,(H4,6,7,8,9,10,11)/p+1 Key: UYTPUPDQBNUYGX-UHFFFAOYSA-O
- SMILES: C1=[NH+]C2=C(N1)C(=O)NC(=N2)N

Properties
Chemical formula	C_{5}H_{6}N_{5}O^{+}
Molar mass	152.136 g·mol^{−1}
- Except where otherwise noted, data are given for materials in their standard state (at 25 °C [77 °F], 100 kPa). Infobox references

A guanine radical cation, often noted as (G^{•+}), is a chemical species resulting from the DNA/RNA nucleobase guanine (G) following electron abstraction. Guanine radical cations are formed via chemical reactions with other molecules or, directly, under the effect of radiation.

From an electrical point of view, guanine radical cations are electron holes contributing to charge transport through the nucleic acids. More importantly, electron holes initially generated on other parts of the nucleic acid may migrate and ultimately be trapped by guanine sites, where they react.

The numerous downstream reaction products of (G^{•+}) provoke oxidative DNA damage, affecting various biological functions. In addition, several research projects explore their applications in fields such as photodynamic therapy and biosensor development. Both biological aspects and the technological uses involving (G^{•+}) are closely related to Guanine quadruplexes, whose building blocks are guanine tetrads.

The properties of (G^{•+}) and their reactivity are studied by spectroscopic, electrochemical, and conductometric techniques, as well as by quantum chemistry methods.

== Formation ==
=== Oxidants ===
One method for generating guanine radical cations involves the one-electron oxidation of guanine by reactive radical species. Common oxidants used for this purpose include the carbonate radical anion (CO_{3}•^{-}) and the nitrogen dioxide radical (•NO_{2}), which are biologically relevant as well as the sulfate radical anion (SO_{4}•^{-}) and various halide radicals (Cl• and Br•). Another approach makes use of photosensitizers, whose electronically excited states act as electron acceptors. A wide range of photosensitizers has been employed, including naphthalimide and anthraquinone derivatives, as well as ruthenium complexes. These compounds may be dissolved in solution, covalently attached to nucleic acids, or intercalated between stacked base pairs.

=== Hole transport ===
Because guanine has the lowest oxidation potential among the canonical DNA and RNA nucleobases electron holes initially generated elsewhere in a nucleic acid molecule can migrate and eventually become trapped at guanine sites. In particular, guanine doublets (GG) and triplets (GGG) act as deeper hole traps than single guanine residues. The exact oxidation potential depends on the primary and secondary structure of the nucleic acid, as well as on environmental factors such as hydration and ionic conditions. Migration lengths of up to 34 nm have been reported for artificial molecular wires, whereas the effective distance in biological context could be as large as 1000 nucleobases.

=== Interaction with radiation ===
Ultraviolet (UV) photons directly absorbed by nucleic acids can cause the ejection of electrons, leading to the formation of guanine radical cations. Both multiphotonic and monophotonic ionization processes have been reported. The one-photon ionization quantum yield of guanosine in aqueous solution, determined by time-resolved absorption spectroscopy at 193 nm, is 0.075, while no photoionization was detected at 266 nm (quantum yield < 4 × 10^{−5}). Nevertheless, guanine radical cations are generated at the latter wavelength through one-photon ionization of DNA duplexes and guanine quadruplexes, with quantum yields ranging from 10^{−3} to 10^{−2}. For more information, see the main article DNA photoionization.

Oxidative damage to nucleic acids caused by high-energy ionizing radiation and accelerated particle beams has been reported in a large number of studies. But, as most of these studies were focused on the final chemical lesions, it remains uncertain whether the observed damage arises from direct electron ejection from nucleobases or from indirect mechanisms involving reactive intermediates generated elsewhere that subsequently interact with DNA. Yet, a few investigations deal with the formation of guanine radical cations, demonstrating their production upon X-ray irradiation of sodium guanosine dihydrate crystals at 4 K, upon γ-ray or Kr-86 ion irradiation of hydrated DNA, and upon electron-beam irradiation of guanosine, guanosine monophosphate, and single- and double-stranded DNA at room temperature.

== Characterization ==
The formation of guanine radical cations is closely linked to their characterization. Because these are unstable transient species that cannot be isolated or analyzed using conventional analytical methods, their study requires advanced physicochemical techniques, often supported by quantum chemistry calculations. Common experimental approaches include:

• Electron paramagnetic resonance (EPR) and electron nuclear double resonance (ENDOR) spectroscopy, typically performed at low temperatures.

• Time-resolved absorption spectroscopy, in which a laser pulse either directly excites the DNA or RNA sample—causing ionization—or initiates the formation of an oxidant that subsequently reacts with the nucleic acid.The guanine radical cation is detected through its absorption spectrum in the ultraviolet–visible or infrared regions.

• Time-resolved Raman spectroscopy.

• Pulsed radiolysis, coupled with absorption spectroscopy or transient electrochemistry, where an electron pulse generates oxidants that interact with the nucleic acid to produce radical cations.

• Spectroelectrochemistry, using UV–visible or infrared detection.

• Electrical conductance measurements, employed to investigate hole transport along guanine stacks.

== Properties ==
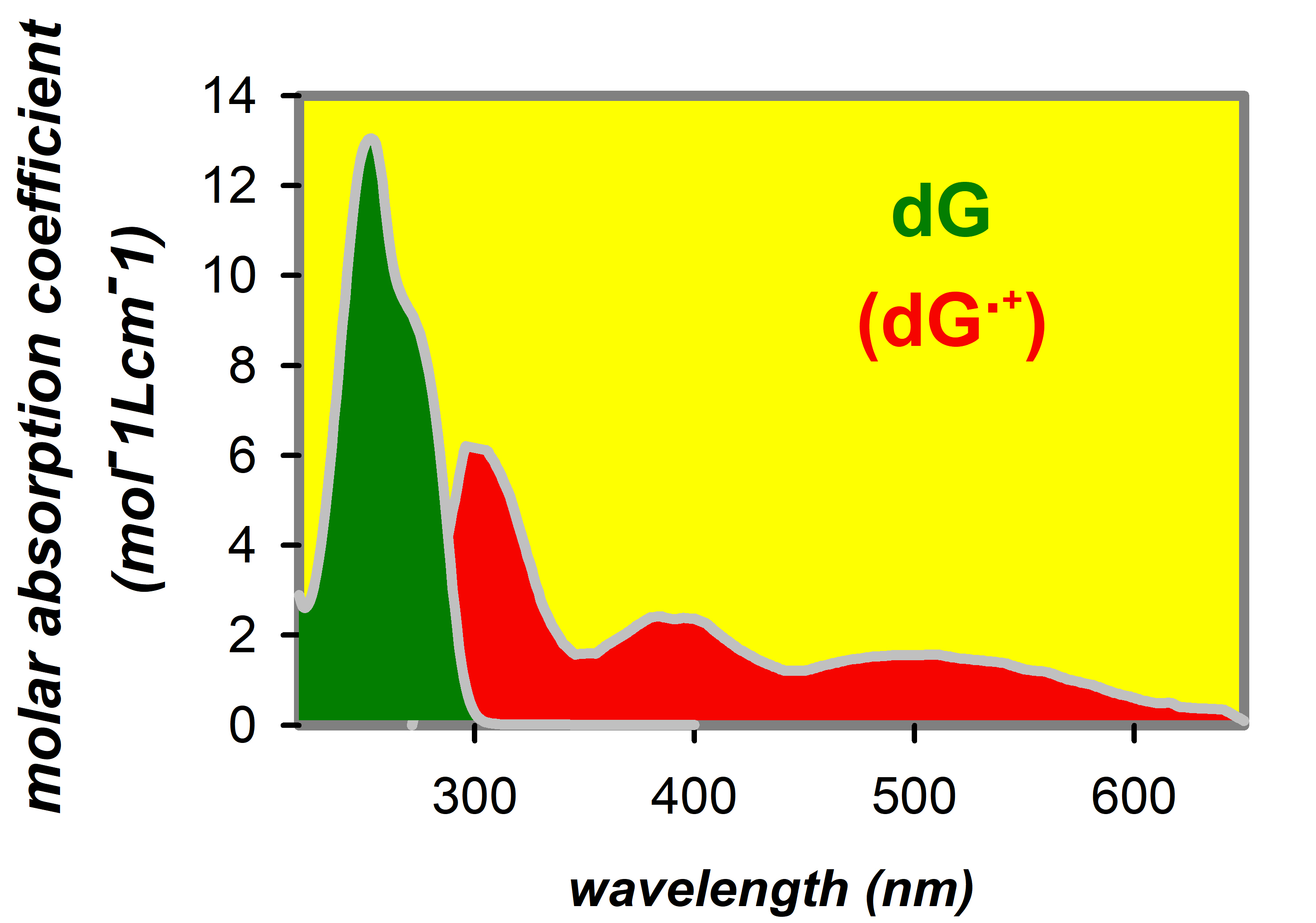
Absorption spectra of 2'-doxyguanosine (dG, green) and its radical cation (red).

Because guanine itself has low solubility, the smallest systems in which the properties of the guanine radical cation is studied experimentally are its methylated derivatives, as well as the nucleoside and nucleotide forms. The (G•^{+}) of all of these compounds exhibit a strong absorption band at 310 nm, along with two weaker bands at 400 nm and 510 nm. EPR experiments and quantum chemical calculations show that the electron hole is primarily localized on the nitrogen and oxygen atoms, consistent with theoretical predictions. In guanine–cytosine (G–C) base pairs, the electron hole is slightly delocalized onto the cytosine base. Electrochemical measurements have indicated that guanine stacking can promote delocalization of the electron hole across multiple bases, although this effect is influenced by subtle geometrical and environmental factors.

== Reactivity in aqueous solution ==
=== Ground state ===
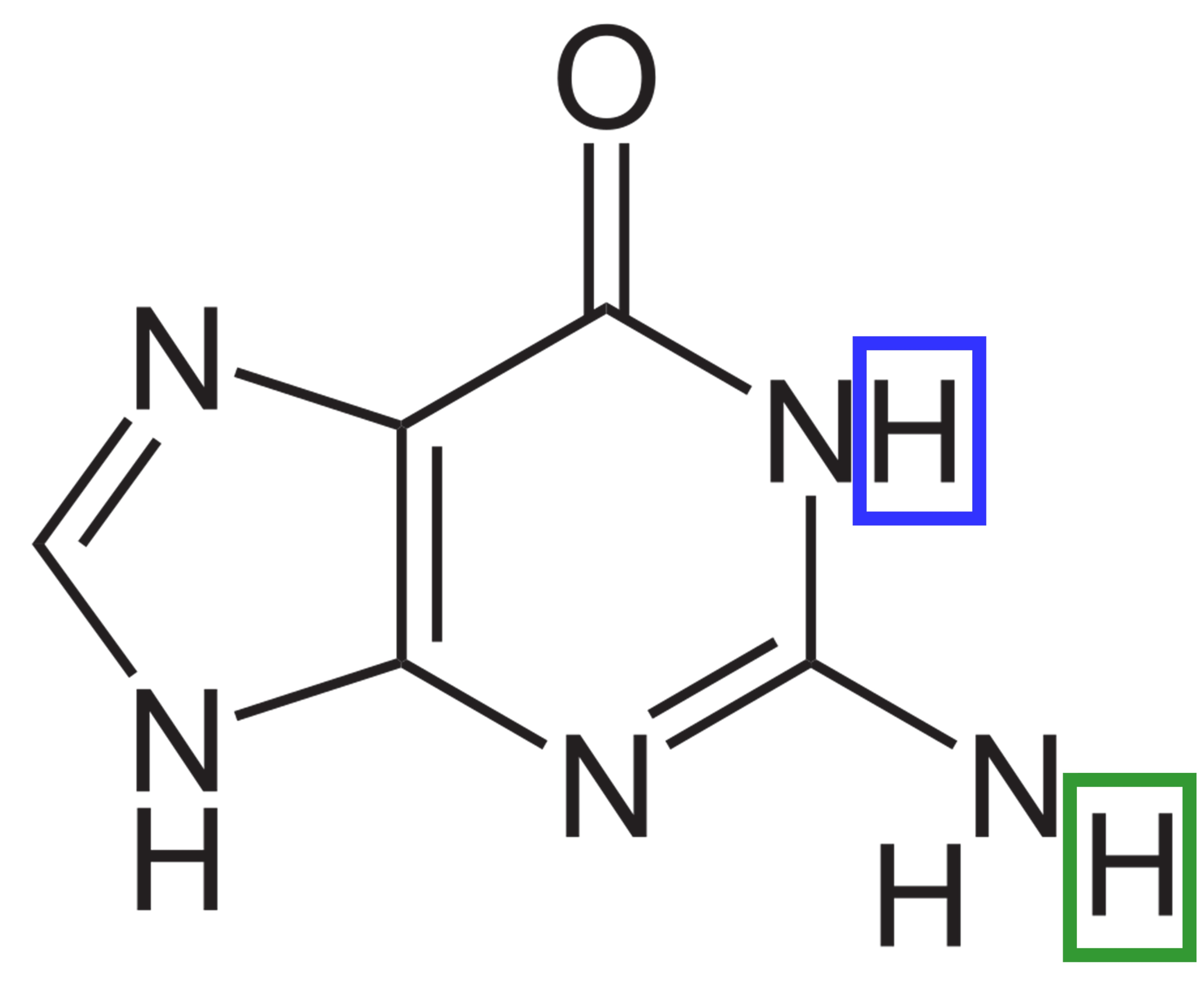
Deprotonation sites of the guanine cation: 1 in blue, 2 in green.

Guanine radical cations are unstable species. In the monomeric form, their pK_{a} is approximately 3.9. Consequently, in aqueous solutions at neutral pH, they tend to lose a proton to water, forming two types of deprotonated radicals, (G–H1)• and (G–H2)•, corresponding to the abstraction of a hydrogen atom from positions N1 and N2 of guanine, respectively. In the G–C base pair, the proton is first transferred to cytosine and subsequently to water. In the presence of oxygen, (G•^{+}) may also evolve into 8-oxoguanine (8-oxoG) and formamidopyrimidine (Fapy).

The lifetime of guanine radical cations, as determined by time-resolved spectroscopic methods, depends strongly on the secondary structure of the nucleic acid. It is approximately 60 ns in the nucleoside and nucleotide forms, and about 300 ns in double-stranded DNA. In guanine quadruplexes, part of the initially formed G•^{+} population deprotonates within less than 1 μs, while a smaller fraction survives for tens of microseconds. Theoretical calculations attributed this inhomogeneous decay behavior to structural effects: inner tetrads are less accessible to water molecules than outer tetrads, which slows the deprotonation rate.

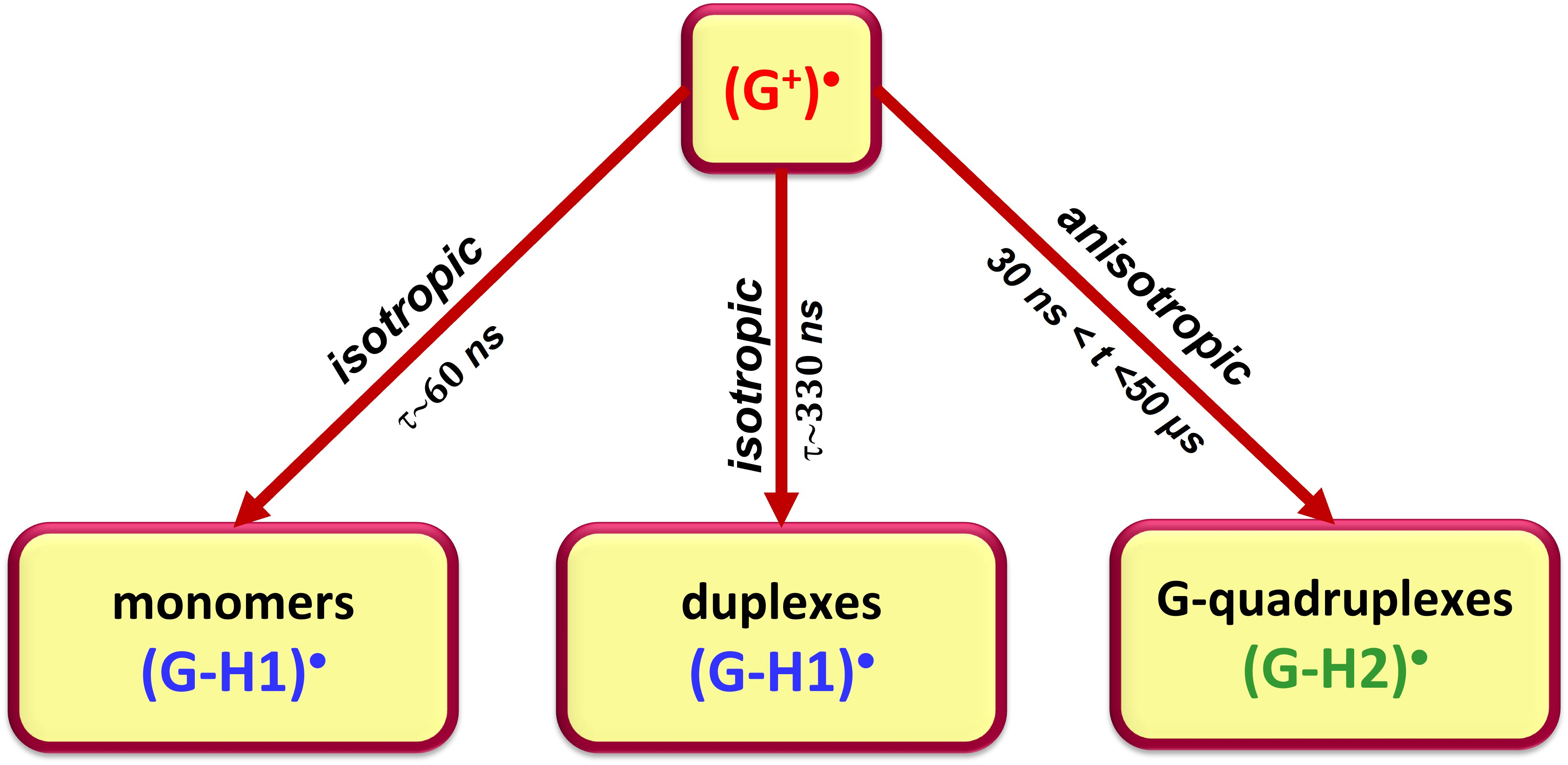
Deprotonation rates and resulting neutral radicals: dependence on the secondary DNA structure.

A key observation from photoionization measurements is the fraction of the initially formed G•^{+} that converts to 8-oxoG. Because deprotonation occurs very rapidly in double-stranded genomic DNA, at least 95% of the (G^{•+}) population is transformed to deprotonated neutral radicals, in line with the observation that the amount of 8-oxoG detected analytically represents only about 2%. In telomeric guanine quadruplexes, where deprotonation is slower, the fraction of 8-oxoG increases to approximately 8%.

=== Excited states ===
The absorption spectrum of (G•^{+}) is located at longer wavelengths in respect to that of its neutral counterpart. As a result, while guanosine absorbs only in the ultraviolet region, (G•^{+}) can absorb visible-light photons, enabling it to undergo photochemical reactions. Upon visible-light irradiation of nucleic acids containing (G•^{+}), sugar radicals are produced.

== Applications ==
Barton and co-worker suggested the use of DNA mediated hole transport and trapping by guanine sites for redox sensing and signaling. The redox properties of G can also be exploited in the development of electrochemical biosensors aiming at the evaluation of antioxidants, or the detection of anticancer drugs. The formation of (G•^{+}) by various photo-oxidants is studied in view of their use in photodynamic therapy.
