= Deoxyguanosine monophosphate =

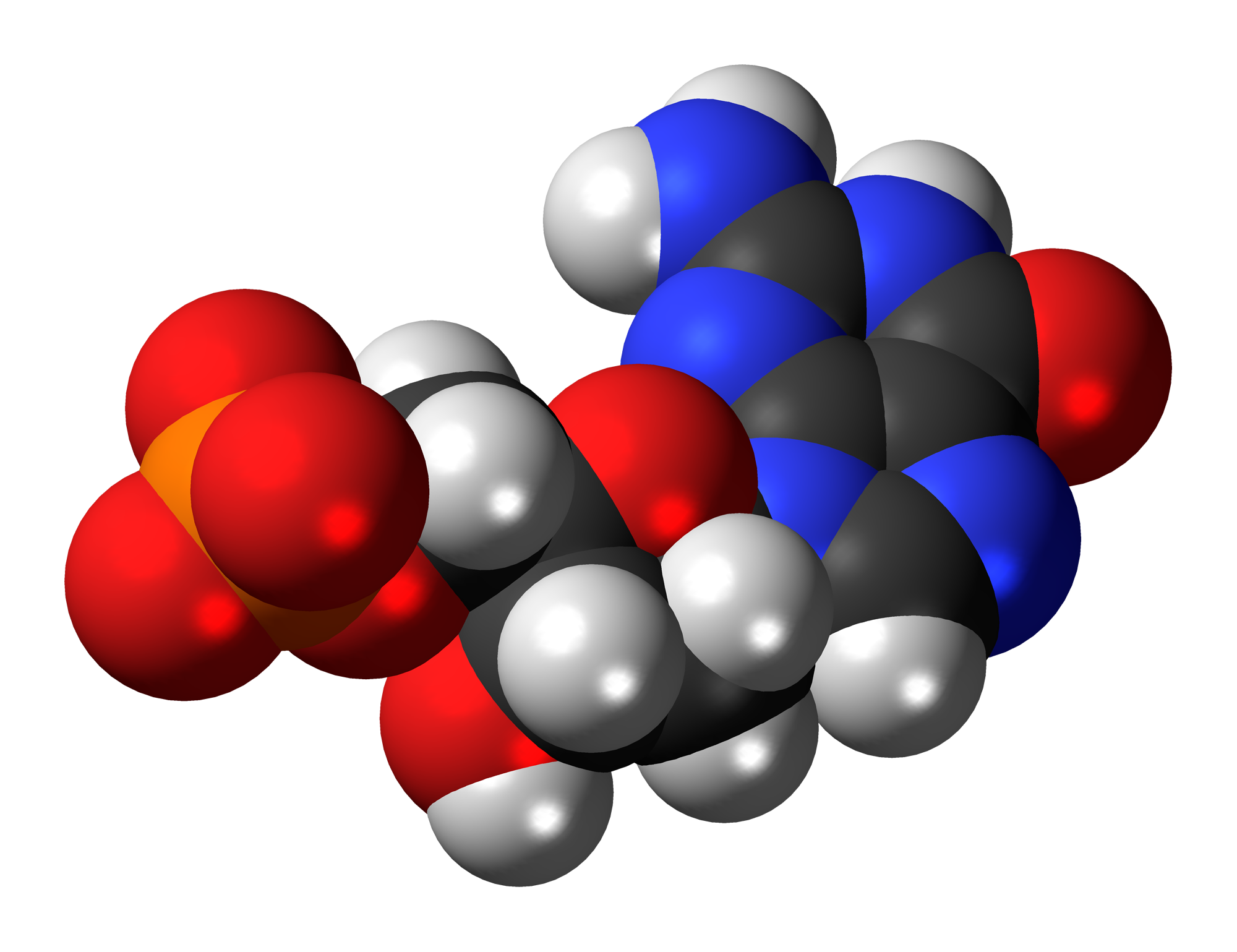

Names
- IUPAC name 2′-Deoxyguanylic acid
- Systematic IUPAC name [(2R,3S,5R)-5-(2-Amino-6-oxo-1,6-dihydro-9H-purin-9-yl)-3-hydroxyoxolan-2-yl]methyl dihydrogen phosphate

Identifiers
CAS Number	902-04-5
3D model (JSmol)	Interactive image
ChEBI	CHEBI:16192
ChemSpider	58570
ECHA InfoCard	100.011.808
IUPHAR/BPS	5122
PubChem CID	65059
UNII	7EAM4TG712
CompTox Dashboard (EPA)	DTXSID20932591, DTXSID60426404 DTXSID20896947, DTXSID20932591, DTXSID60426404
- InChI: InChI=1S/C10H14N5O7P/c11-10-13-8-7(9(17)14-10)12-3-15(8)6-1-4(16)5(22-6)2-21-23(18,19)20/h3-6,16H,1-2H2,(H2,18,19,20)(H3,11,13,14,17)/t4-,5+,6+/m0/s1 Key: LTFMZDNNPPEQNG-KVQBGUIXSA-N; InChI=1/C10H14N5O7P/c11-10-13-8-7(9(17)14-10)12-3-15(8)6-1-4(16)5(22-6)2-21-23(18,19)20/h3-6,16H,1-2H2,(H2,18,19,20)(H3,11,13,14,17)/t4-,5+,6+/m0/s1 Key: LTFMZDNNPPEQNG-KVQBGUIXBV
- SMILES: Nc1nc2n(cnc2c(=O)[nH]1)[C@H]1C[C@H](O)[C@@H](COP(O)(O)=O)O1

Properties
Chemical formula	C_{10}H_{14}N_{5}O_{7}P
Molar mass	347.2243
- Except where otherwise noted, data are given for materials in their standard state (at 25 °C [77 °F], 100 kPa). verify (what is ?) Infobox references

Deoxyguanosine monophosphate (dGMP), also known as deoxyguanylic acid or deoxyguanylate in its conjugate acid and conjugate base forms, respectively, is a derivative of the common nucleotide guanosine triphosphate (GTP), in which the –OH (hydroxyl) group on the 2' carbon on the ribose has been reduced to just a hydrogen atom (hence the "deoxy-" part of the name). It is used as a monomer in DNA.

== See also ==
- Cofactor
- Guanosine
- Nucleic acid
