= 4-Hydroxy-2,4,5-triaminopyrimidine =

Names
- Preferred IUPAC name 2,5,6-Triaminopyrimidin-4-ol
- Other names 2,5,6-Triamino-4(1H)-pyrimidinone

Identifiers
CAS Number	1004-75-7
3D model (JSmol)	Interactive image
ChEBI	CHEBI:137796
ChEMBL	ChEMBL2151965
ChemSpider	63663
ECHA InfoCard	100.012.478
EC Number	213-725-4
PubChem CID	135406869
UNII	FR001FJW89
CompTox Dashboard (EPA)	DTXSID3061396
- InChI: InChI=1S/C4H7N5O/c5-1-2(6)8-4(7)9-3(1)10/h5H2,(H5,6,7,8,9,10) Key: SYEYEGBZVSWYPK-UHFFFAOYSA-N
- SMILES: C1(=C(N=C(NC1=O)N)N)N

Properties
Chemical formula	C_{4}H_{7}N_{5}O
Molar mass	141.134 g·mol^{−1}
Melting point	165–167 °C (329–333 °F; 438–440 K)
- Except where otherwise noted, data are given for materials in their standard state (at 25 °C [77 °F], 100 kPa). Infobox references

4-Hydroxy-2,4,5-triaminopyrimidine is an organic compound with the formula C_{4}N_{2}(OH)(NH_{2})_{3}. The compound is classified as a pyrimidine substituted with three amino groups and a hydroxyl group.

== Tautomers ==
The title compound is one of several possible tautomers. As established by X-ray crystallography, the doubly protonated derivative 2,4,5-triamino-1,6-dihydropyrimidin-6-one, which is red-orange, can be obtained as the sulfate salt.

== Preparation and biosynthetic significance ==
In historic work, 4-hydroxy-2,4,5-triaminopyrimidine was shown to condense with formic acid to give guanine, a nucleic acid found in both RNA and DNA (not recognized at the time of its synthesis). Traube et al. had previously made 4-hydroxy-2,4,5-triaminopyrimidine by cyclization of cyanoacetylguanidine.

Like most aromatic 1,2-diamines, 4-hydroxy-2,4,5-triaminopyrimidine condenses with glyoxal to give a pterin.

The biosynthesis of riboflavin proceeds via this diamine, which is derived from guanine.

4-Hydroxy-2,4,5-triaminopyrimidine can be prepared in the laboratory from simple precursors that may be relevant to the origin of life. Reminiscent of the early work of Traube et al., it arises by condensation of guanidine, aminomalononitrile (trimer of HCN), and aminocyanoacetamide.
