= Luscan–Lumish syndrome =

Congenital disorder

Luscan–Lumish syndrome (LLS), also known as SETD2-related overgrowth syndrome, is rare congenital disorder characterized by postnatal overgrowth, obesity, Chiari malformation, seizures, and intellectual disability. Mutations in the SET domain-containing protein 2 (SETD2) gene, which encodes a histone methyltransferase, are linked to LLS, although the mechanisms driving this syndrome are not well understood.

== Background ==
Luscan–Lumish syndrome is a rare condition characterized by overgrowth, macrocephaly, obesity, type I Chiari malformation, and language delays. It has been identified as an autosomal dominant genetic disorder and is associated with variants in the SETD2 gene. Located at 3p21.31, the SETD2 gene comprises 23 exons and 22 introns, spanning approximately 147 KB. The histone methyltransferases (HMTs) encoded by SETD2 serve as crucial epigenetic regulators, playing significant roles in various biological processes, including the regulation of histone methylation, gene transcription, maintenance of genomic stability, and remodeling of the epigenome and (epi)cytoskeleton.

The syndrome was only recognized until 2012. Since then, it has been officially designated as Luscan–Lumish syndrome, also referred to as "SETD2-related overgrowth syndrome."

== Clinical presentation ==
Patients with Luscan–Lumish syndrome exhibit a range of physical and neurological abnormalities. Facial features include downslanted palpebral fissures, a high anterior hairline, a prominent forehead, and a long face and long nose. Individuals may also present with mandibular prognathia and a pointed chin. Other features include a high forehead, malar flattening, and macrocephaly.

In terms of limb abnormalities, advanced ossification of the carpal bones and long feet may be observed. Genitourinary issues manifest as irregular menstruation and polycystic ovaries. The immune system can also be affected, leading to recurrent otitis media. Musculoskeletal abnormalities are characterized by generalized hypotonia, while neurological manifestations include behavioral issues such as aggressive behavior, anxiety, excessive shyness, and autistic tendencies. Patients may experience delays in speech and language development, global developmental delay, and varying degrees of intellectual disability. Other neurological concerns include Chiari malformation, syringomyelia, ventriculomegaly, seizures, and slurred speech.

Growth abnormalities are another clinical feature, with individuals exhibiting obesity, overgrowth, or short stature.

== Diagnosis ==
Luscan–Lumish syndrome should be distinguished in patients who exhibit gigantism but do not have pituitary tumors.
