= 5-Hydroxyhydantoin =

Names
- IUPAC name 5-Hydroxy-2,4-imidazolidinedione
- Other names Glyoxalurea; Allanturic acid

Identifiers
CAS Number	29410-13-7
3D model (JSmol)	Interactive image
ChEBI	CHEBI:195336
ChemSpider	3369395
PubChem CID	4157426
UNII	53RWX86RYV
CompTox Dashboard (EPA)	DTXSID80400049
- InChI: InChI=1S/C3H4N2O3/c6-1-2(7)5-3(8)4-1/h1,6H,(H2,4,5,7,8) Key: WYLUZALOENCNQU-UHFFFAOYSA-N; InChI=1S/C3H4N2O3/c6-1-2(7)5-3(8)4-1/h1,6H,(H2,4,5,7,8) Key: WYLUZALOENCNQU-UHFFFAOYSA-N
- SMILES: OC1NC(=O)NC1=O

Properties
Chemical formula	C_{3}H_{4}N_{2}O_{3}
Molar mass	116.076 g·mol^{−1}
- Except where otherwise noted, data are given for materials in their standard state (at 25 °C [77 °F], 100 kPa). Infobox references

5-Hydroxyhydantoin is an oxidation product of 2′-deoxycytidine. If not repaired, it may be processed by DNA polymerases that induce mutagenic processes.
