= Tet methylcytosine dioxygenase 3 =

Protein-coding gene in the species Homo sapiens

TET3

Identifiers
- Aliases: TET3, hCG_40738, tet methylcytosine dioxygenase 3, BEFAHRS
- External IDs: OMIM: 613555; MGI: 2446229; GeneCards: TET3
Enzyme activity
EC #	BRENDA	ExPASy	KEGG	MetaCyc
1.14.11.80	↗	↗	↗	↗

Gene location (Human)
Chr.	Chromosome 2 (human)
Band	2p13.1	Start	73,984,910 bp
Band	2p13.1	End	74,108,176 bp

Gene location (Mouse)
Chr.	Chromosome 6 (mouse)
Band	6|6 C3	Start	83,339,355 bp
Band	6|6 C3	End	83,436,066 bp
RNA expression pattern
Bgee	Human / Mouse (ortholog); Top expressed in: oocyte; secondary oocyte; skin of thigh; gingival epithelium; skin of arm; trabecular bone; human penis; skin of hip; bone marrow; oral cavity / Top expressed in: zygote; secondary oocyte; trophoblast giant cell; epithelium of urethra; genital tubercle; Rostral migratory stream; epithelium of female urethra; neural layer of retina; lip; epithelium of male urethra; More reference expression data
BioGPS	n/a
Gene ontology
Molecular function	DNA binding; dioxygenase activity; metal ion binding; protein binding; oxidoreductase activity; DNA-binding transcription factor activity, RNA polymerase II-specific; methylcytosine dioxygenase activity; iron ion binding
Cellular component	cytoplasm; nucleus; chromosome; female pronucleus; male pronucleus
Biological process	histone H3-K4 trimethylation; protein O-linked glycosylation; multicellular organism development; positive regulation of transcription by RNA polymerase II; chromatin organization; DNA demethylation of male pronucleus; DNA demethylation; 5-methylcytosine catabolic process; oxidative demethylation
Sources:Amigo / QuickGO
Orthologs
Databases	NCBI: entry; OMA: entry
Species	Human	Mouse
Entrez	200424	194388
Ensembl	ENSG00000187605	ENSMUSG00000034832
UniProt	O43151	Q8BG87
RefSeq (mRNA)	NM_001287491; NM_001366022	NM_183138; NM_001347313
RefSeq (protein)	NP_001274420; NP_001352951	NP_001334242; NP_898961
Location (UCSC)	Chr 2: 73.98 – 74.11 Mb	Chr 6: 83.34 – 83.44 Mb
PubMed search
- Wikidata
View/Edit Human	View/Edit Mouse

Tet methylcytosine dioxygenase 3 is a protein that in humans is encoded by the TET3 gene.

== Function ==
Tet3 and its respective protein TET 3 are members of the TET (ten-eleven-translocation) family of genes and proteins that play a role in DNA demethylation. DNA demethylation is the removal of suppressive methyl groups from the cytosine of DNA. Demethylating the DNA and removing these markers is associated with increased transcription. Since DNA methylation is a relatively strong and stable marker it is not often removed. However, there are important points in an organism's life when these marks benefit from being removed so that certain genes can be accessed and transcribed.

One of which is right after an egg and sperm have come together to form a zygote. The methylation marks from the parent cells must be removed so that certain genes can be accessed and transcribed for the zygote to mature into a fully grown organism. Tet3 plays an important role here. The TET3 protein works to demethylate the genome of the fertilized zygote to allow it to grow into a fully developed organism. It does this by starting a series of oxidation reactions that convert the methylated cytosine on the DNA from 5-methyl cytosine (5mC) into 5-hydroxymethylcytosine (5hmC). This cytosine base then goes through a further series of reactions after which it can be removed either passively through replication-dependent dilution or actively by the enzyme thymidine DNA glycosylase and replaced with an unmethylated cytosine base. Once this occurs the DNA is now more accessible for transcription.

There are certain tissues that rely heavily on Tet3 for their development. For example, TET3 is found in large quantities in neurons and is important for their development and maturation. While there is not much work regarding the role of Tet3 in humans, studies have been done on model organisms such as mice, frogs, and rats. An experiment done by several researchers on mice showed that Tet3 is most active in NPC or Neuronal Progenitor Cells. These cells are the progenitors of mature neurons and begin to develop shortly after a zygote is formed. Once an embryonic stem cell begins to differentiate into an NPC, Tet3 becomes upregulated. The researchers speculate that this occurs in order to demethylate genes associated with neuronal maturation so they can be transcribed. While Tet3 is not important for the commitment of an embryonic stem cell to turn into an NPC, it is important for maintaining the cell as an NPC and eventually turning it into a mature neuron. The complete absence or knockout of Tet3 in mouse cells leads to increased apoptosis of neurons, demonstrating how important the gene is to neuronal development.

In addition, Tet3 is important for repair and upkeep in mature neurons. Epigenetic markers, especially ones that make the DNA more accessible, are important after cell damage because they can turn on genes that function in cell repair. A recent study done in vivo in rats has shown that the TET3 protein is important in recovery after a stroke. The study shows that TET3 as well as its product, 5-hydroxymethylcytosine (5hmC), are expressed more after focal ischemia in order to demethylate and turn on genes associated with DNA repair in neurons. Knockdown of the TET3 protein in these rats led to increased neuron damage after a stroke and a decreased expression of several genes that aid in neuron repair. These results not only demonstrate the importance of Tet3 in neuronal repair but also suggest Tet3 and its protein as a possible therapeutic target for future studies that could aid patients in neuronal repair after a stroke.

In humans, less is known about the exact role of Tet3 in neurons. Current studies in humans are focusing on the effects of mutant Tet3 on an individual's phenotype. While the complete knockout of Tet3 appears to be fatal to the developing zygote, the mutation of one or more alleles of Tet3 can result in viable offspring. These mutations of Tet3 can greatly affect the TET3 protein and lead to a class of neurodevelopmental disorders in humans known as Beck–Fahrner syndrome. Individuals with these mutations experience phenotypes such as developmental delay and growth abnormalities as well as features found in other neurodevelopmental disorders such as Sotos Syndrome and Autism Spectrum Disorder.

Little is known about the exact mutations on Tet3 that cause Beck–Fahrner syndrome and their inheritance patterns. However, the mutations seem to follow a Mendelian pattern of inheritance. In a recent study of affected individuals and their families, some were found to have autosomal-dominant patterns of inheritance while others were found to have autosomal-recessive patterns of inheritance. Regardless of the inheritance pattern, all mutations in this gene were shown to be caused by either a missense variant in the region of the gene that codes for the catalytic domain of TET3 or a frameshift or nonsense variant in the same region. The region in which this mutation occurs is highly conserved among species, especially mice and humans, which is why work done on model organisms may be useful in bettering our understanding of Tet3's function in humans.

In conclusion, the Tet3 gene is important in a variety of organisms including humans, rats, and mice. It functions mostly during the formation of a zygote, particularly in neurons. There it helps neurons mature and develop as well as aids them in repair.

== Clinical ==
Mutations in this gene can result in Beck–Fahrner syndrome, which has been associated a number of abnormal phenotypic features including intellectual disability, developmental delay, hypotonia, autistic traits, movement disorders, growth abnormalities and facial dysmorphism.
