= Guanine =

Chemical compound of DNA and RNA

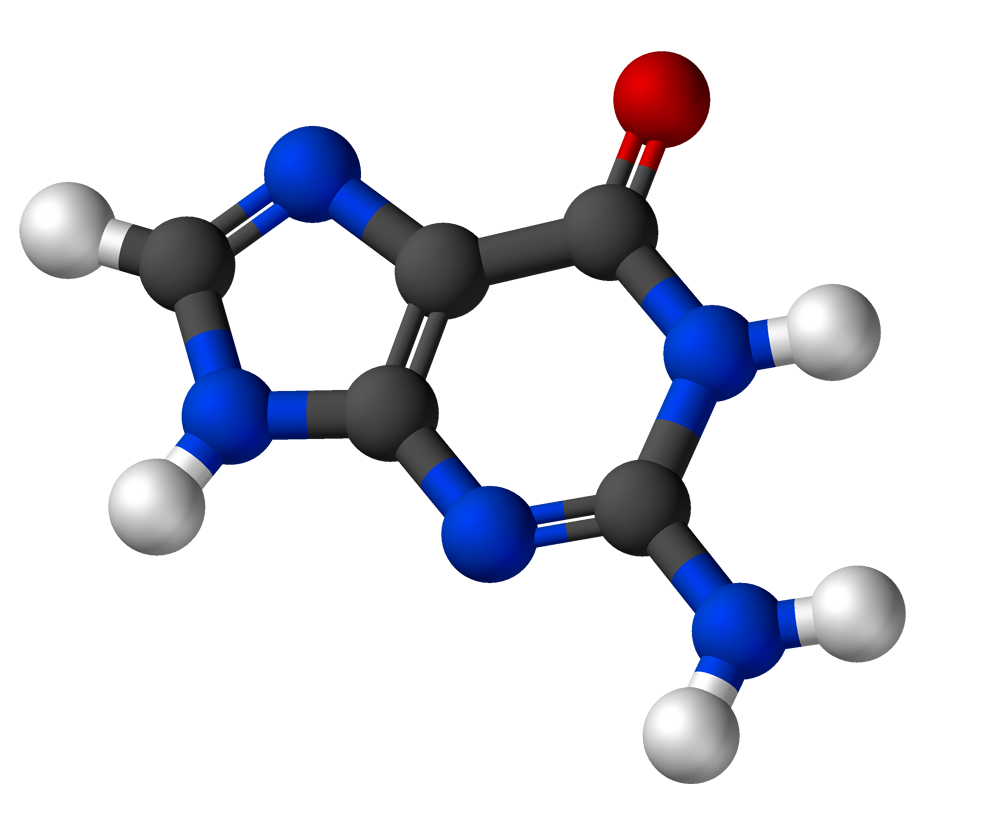

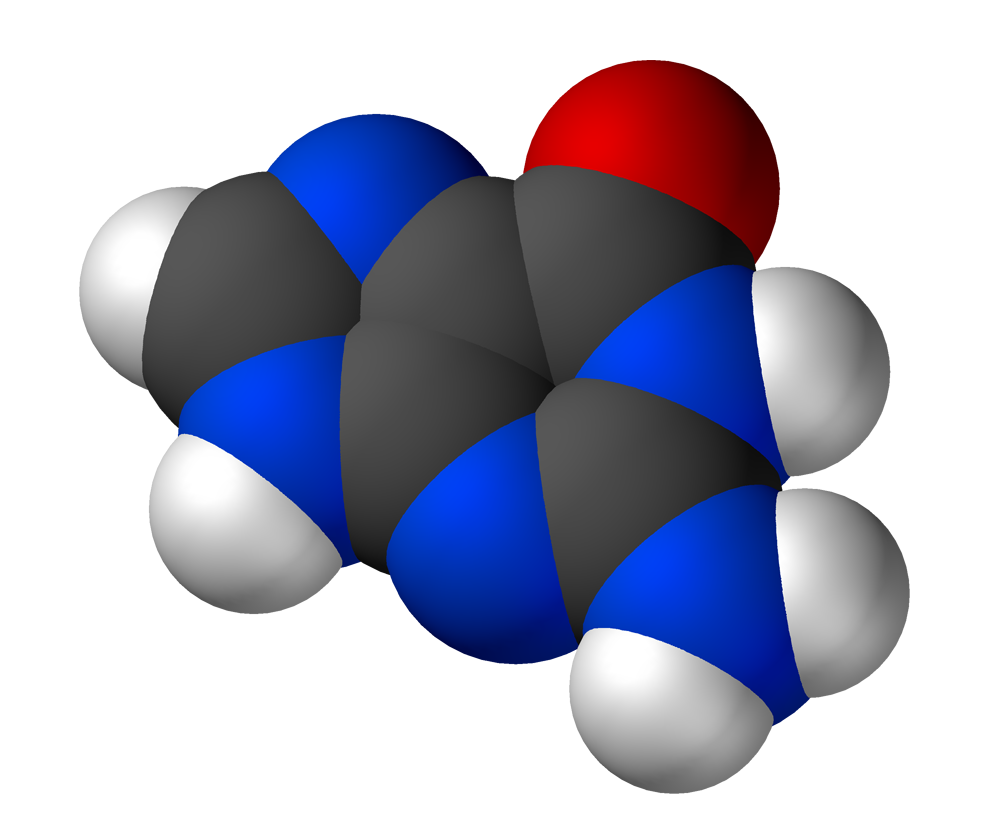

Names
- Preferred IUPAC name 2-Amino-1,9-dihydro-6H-purin-6-one
- Other names 2-amino-6-hydroxypurine, 2-aminohypoxanthine, Guanine

Identifiers
CAS Number	73-40-5
3D model (JSmol)	keto form: Interactive image; enol form: Interactive image
Beilstein Reference	147911
ChEBI	CHEBI:16235
ChEMBL	ChEMBL219568
ChemSpider	744
DrugBank	DB02377
ECHA InfoCard	100.000.727
EC Number	200-799-8
Gmelin Reference	431879
IUPHAR/BPS	4556
KEGG	C00242
PubChem CID	135398634
RTECS number	MF8260000
UNII	5Z93L87A1R
CompTox Dashboard (EPA)	DTXSID9052476
- InChI: InChI=1S/C5H5N5O/c6-5-9-3-2(4(11)10-5)7-1-8-3/h1H,(H4,6,7,8,9,10,11) Key: UYTPUPDQBNUYGX-UHFFFAOYSA-N; InChI=1/C5H5N5O/c6-5-9-3-2(4(11)10-5)7-1-8-3/h1H,(H4,6,7,8,9,10,11) Key: UYTPUPDQBNUYGX-UHFFFAOYAE
- SMILES: keto form: N1C(N)=NC=2NC=NC2C1=O; enol form: OC1=C2N=CNC2=NC(=N1)N

Properties
Chemical formula	C_{5}H_{5}N_{5}O
Molar mass	151.13 g/mol
Appearance	White amorphous solid.
Density	2.200 g/cm^{3} (calculated)
Melting point	360 °C (680 °F; 633 K) decomposes
Boiling point	Sublimes
Solubility in water	Insoluble.
Acidity (pK_{a})	3.3 (amide), 9.2 (secondary), 12.3 (primary)

Hazards
- Occupational safety and health (OHS/OSH)
Main hazards	Irritant
NFPA 704 (fire diamond)	1 1
Flash point	Non-flammable

Related compounds
Related compounds	Cytosine; Adenine; Thymine; Uracil
- Except where otherwise noted, data are given for materials in their standard state (at 25 °C [77 °F], 100 kPa). verify (what is ?) Infobox references

Guanine (/ˈɡwɑːniːn/) (symbol G or Gua) is one of the four main nucleotide bases found in the nucleic acids DNA and RNA, the others being adenine, cytosine, and thymine (uracil in RNA). In DNA, guanine is paired with cytosine. The guanine nucleoside is called guanosine.

With the formula C_{5}H_{5}N_{5}O, guanine is a derivative of purine, consisting of a fused pyrimidine-imidazole ring system with conjugated double bonds. This unsaturated arrangement means the bicyclic molecule is planar.

== Properties ==
Guanine, along with adenine and cytosine, is present in both DNA and RNA, whereas thymine is usually seen only in DNA, and uracil only in RNA.

Guanine has multiple tautomeric forms. For both the imidazole and pyrimidine rings, the proton can reside on either of the ring nitrogens. But a single tautomeric form dominates in nucleoside or nucleotide versions of guanine.

Guanine binds to cytosine through three hydrogen bonds. In cytosine, the amino group acts as the hydrogen bond donor and the C-2 carbonyl and the N-3 amine as the hydrogen-bond acceptors. Guanine has the C-6 carbonyl group that acts as the hydrogen bond acceptor, while a group at N-1 and the amino group at C-2 act as the hydrogen bond donors.

Cytosine

Guanine

Cytosine and guanine with the direction of hydrogen bonding indicated (arrow points positive to negative charge)

Guanine can be hydrolyzed with strong acid to glycine, ammonia, carbon dioxide, and carbon monoxide. First, guanine gets deaminated to become xanthine. Guanine oxidizes more readily than adenine, the other purine-derivative base in DNA. Its high melting point of 350 °C reflects the intermolecular hydrogen bonding between the oxo and amino groups in the molecules in the crystal. Because of this intermolecular bonding, guanine is relatively insoluble in water, but it is soluble in dilute acids and bases. Among the DNA/RNA bases, guanine has the lowest oxidation potential playing a key role in the oxidatively induced damage to nucleic acids. See main article guanine radical cations and DNA oxidation.

== History ==
The first isolation of guanine was reported in 1844 by the German chemist Julius Bodo Unger (1819–1885), who obtained it as a mineral formed from the excreta of sea birds, which is known as guano and which was used as a source of fertilizer; guanine was named in 1846. Between 1882 and 1906, Emil Fischer determined the structure and also showed that uric acid can be converted to guanine.

== Synthesis ==
A Fischer–Tropsch synthesis can be used to form guanine, along with adenine, uracil, and thymine. Heating an equimolar gas mixture of CO, H_{2}, and NH_{3} to 700 °C for 15 to 24 minutes, followed by quick cooling and then sustained reheating to 100 to 200 °C for 16 to 44 hours with an alumina catalyst, yielded guanine and uracil:

10CO + H_{2} + 10NH_{3} → 2C_{5}H_{8}N_{5}O (guanine) + 8H_{2}O

Trace amounts of guanine form by the polymerization of ammonium cyanide (NH_{4}CN). Two experiments conducted by Levy et al. showed that heating 10 mol·L^{−1} NH_{4}CN at 80 °C for 24 hours gave a yield of 0.0007%, while using 0.1 mol·L^{−1} NH_{4}CN frozen at −20 °C for 25 years gave a 0.0035% yield. These results indicate guanine could arise in frozen regions of the primitive earth. In 1984, Yuasa reported a 0.00017% yield of guanine after the electrical discharge of NH_{3}, CH_{4}, C_{2}H_{6}, and 50 mL of water, followed by a subsequent acid hydrolysis. However, it is unknown whether the presence of guanine was not simply a resultant contaminant of the reaction.

10NH_{3} + 2CH_{4} + 4C_{2}H_{6} + 2H_{2}O → 2C_{5}H_{8}N_{5}O (guanine) + 25H_{2}

Another possible abiotic route was explored by quenching a 90% N_{2}–10%CO–H_{2}O gas mixture high-temperature plasma.

Traube's synthesis involves heating 4-hydroxy-2,4,5-triaminopyrimidine with formic acid for several hours.

== Biosynthesis ==
Guanine is not primarily synthesized de novo. Instead, it is split from the more complex molecule guanosine by the enzyme guanosine phosphorylase:

guanosine + phosphate $\rightleftharpoons$ guanine + alpha-D-ribose 1-phosphate

Guanine can be synthesized de novo, with the rate-limiting enzyme of inosine monophosphate dehydrogenase.

== Other occurrences and biological uses ==
The word guanine derives from the Spanish loanword guano ('bird/bat droppings'), which itself is from the Quechua word wanu, meaning 'dung'. As the Oxford English Dictionary notes, guanine is "A white amorphous substance obtained abundantly from guano, forming a constituent of the excrement of birds".

In 1656 in Paris, a Mr. Jaquin extracted from the scales of the fish Alburnus alburnus so-called "pearl essence", which is crystalline guanine. In the cosmetics industry, crystalline guanine is used as an additive to various products (e.g., shampoos), where it provides a pearly iridescent effect. It is also used in metallic paints and simulated pearls and plastics. It provides shimmering luster to eye shadow and nail polish. Facial treatments using the droppings, or guano, from Japanese nightingales have been used in Japan and elsewhere, because the guanine in the droppings makes the skin look paler. Guanine crystals are rhombic platelets composed of multiple transparent layers, but they have a high index of refraction that partially reflects and transmits light from layer to layer, thus producing a pearly luster. It can be applied by spray, painting, or dipping. It may irritate the eyes. Its alternatives are mica, faux pearl (from ground shells), and aluminium and bronze particles.

Guanine has a very wide variety of biological uses that include a range of functions ranging in both complexity and versatility. These include camouflage, display, and vision among other purposes.

Spiders, scorpions, and some amphibians convert ammonia, as a product of protein metabolism in the cells, to guanine, as it can be excreted with minimal water loss.

Guanine is also found in specialized skin cells of fish called iridocytes (e.g., the sturgeon), as well as being present in the reflective deposits of the eyes of deep-sea fish and some reptiles, such as crocodiles and chameleons.

On 8 August 2011, a report, based on NASA studies with meteorites found on Earth, was published suggesting building blocks of DNA and RNA (guanine, adenine and related organic molecules) may have been formed extra-terrestrially in outer space.

== See also ==
- Cytosine
- Guanine deaminase
