= Musculoskeletal abnormality =

- Specialty: Medical genetics

A musculoskeletal abnormality is a disorder of the musculoskeletal system present at birth.

They can be due to deformity or malformation.

Examples include:

- Klippel–Feil syndrome
- Ectrodactyly with tibia aplasia/hypoplasia

Although present at birth, some only become obvious postnatally.
