= Guanosine =

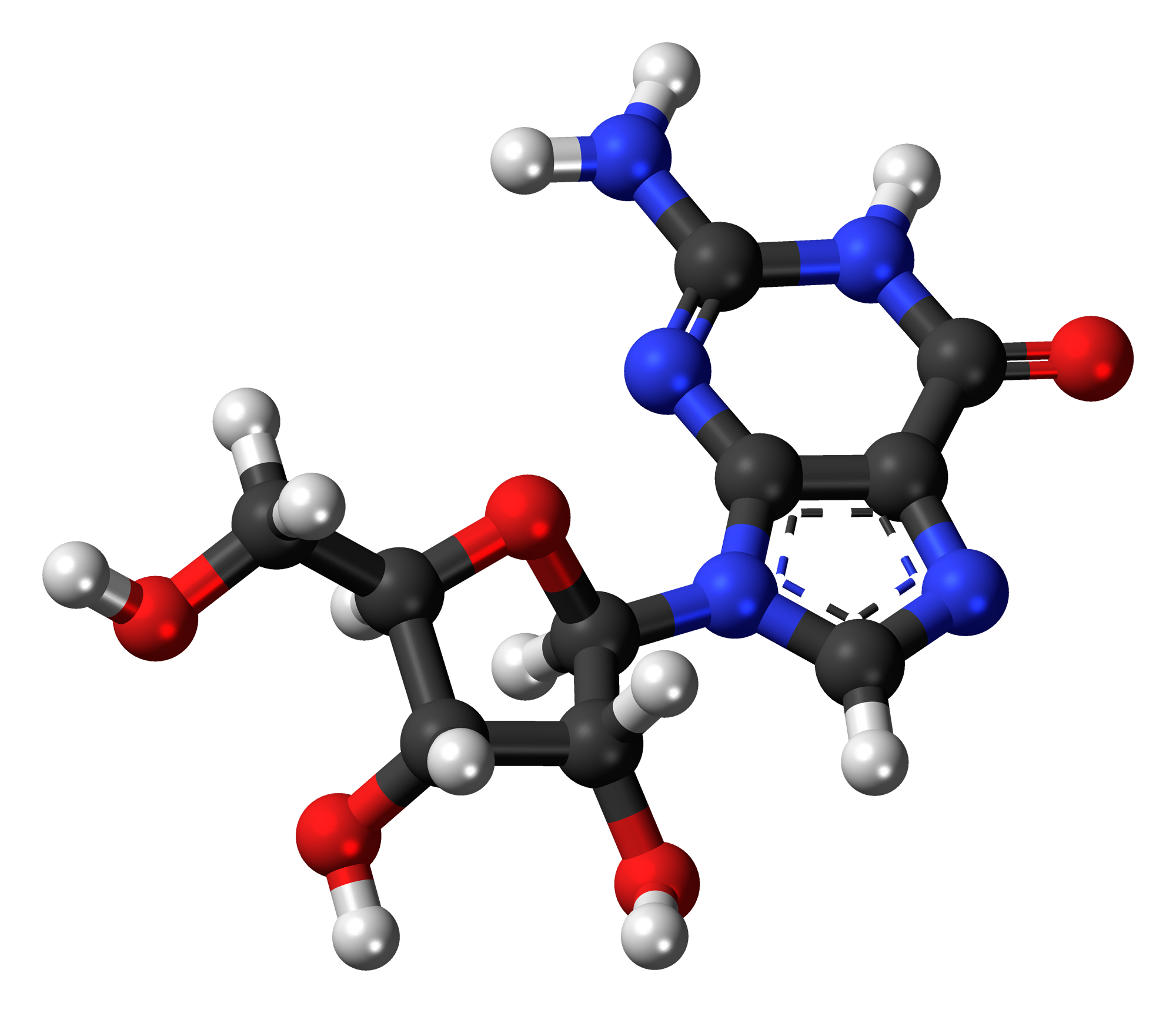

Names
- IUPAC name Guanosine
- Systematic IUPAC name 2-Amino-9-[(2R,3R,4S,5R)-3,4-dihydroxy-5-(hydroxymethyl)oxolan-2-yl]-1,9-dihydro-6H-purin-6-one
- Other names Guanine riboside

Identifiers
CAS Number	118-00-3
3D model (JSmol)	Interactive image
ChEBI	CHEBI:16750
ChEMBL	ChEMBL375655
ChemSpider	6544
DrugBank	DB02857
ECHA InfoCard	100.003.844
IUPHAR/BPS	4567
KEGG	C00387
MeSH	Guanosine
PubChem CID	765
UNII	12133JR80S
CompTox Dashboard (EPA)	DTXSID00893055
- InChI: InChI=1S/C10H13N5O5/c11-10-13-7-4(8(19)14-10)12-2-15(7)9-6(18)5(17)3(1-16)20-9/h2-3,5-6,9,16-18H,1H2,(H3,11,13,14,19)/t3-,5-,6-,9-/m1/s1 Key: NYHBQMYGNKIUIF-UUOKFMHZSA-N; InChI=1/C10H13N5O5/c11-10-13-7-4(8(19)14-10)12-2-15(7)9-6(18)5(17)3(1-16)20-9/h2-3,5-6,9,16-18H,1H2,(H3,11,13,14,19)/t3-,5-,6-,9-/m1/s1 Key: NYHBQMYGNKIUIF-UUOKFMHZBU
- SMILES: c1nc2c(=O)[nH]c(nc2n1[C@H]3[C@@H]([C@@H]([C@H](O3)CO)O)O)N

Properties
Chemical formula	C_{10}H_{13}N_{5}O_{5}
Molar mass	283.241
Appearance	white, crystalline powder
Odor	odorless
Melting point	239 (decomposes)
Magnetic susceptibility (χ)	−149.1·10^{−6} cm^{3}/mol
- Except where otherwise noted, data are given for materials in their standard state (at 25 °C [77 °F], 100 kPa). verify (what is ?) Infobox references

Guanosine (symbol G or Guo) is a purine nucleoside comprising guanine attached to a ribose (ribofuranose) ring via a β-N_{9}-glycosidic bond. Guanosine can be phosphorylated to become guanosine monophosphate (GMP), cyclic guanosine monophosphate (cGMP), guanosine diphosphate (GDP), and guanosine triphosphate (GTP). These forms play important roles in various biochemical processes such as synthesis of nucleic acids and proteins, photosynthesis, muscle contraction, and intracellular signal transduction (cGMP). When guanine is attached by its N9 nitrogen to the C1 carbon of a deoxyribose ring it is known as deoxyguanosine.

== Physical and chemical properties ==
Guanosine is a white, crystalline powder with no odor and mild saline taste. It is very soluble in acetic acid, slightly soluble in water, insoluble in ethanol, diethyl ether, benzene and chloroform.

== Functions ==
Guanosine is required for an RNA splicing reaction in mRNA, when a "self-splicing" intron removes itself from the mRNA message by cutting at both ends, re-ligating, and leaving just the exons on either side to be translated into protein.

Guanosine with numbered carbons

== Uses ==
The antiviral drug acyclovir, often used in herpes treatment, and the anti-HIV drug abacavir, are structurally similar to guanosine. Guanosine was also used to make regadenoson.

== Sources ==
Guanosine can be found in pancreas, clover, coffee plant, and pollen of pines.
