= Nicola Allen =

British glial biologist

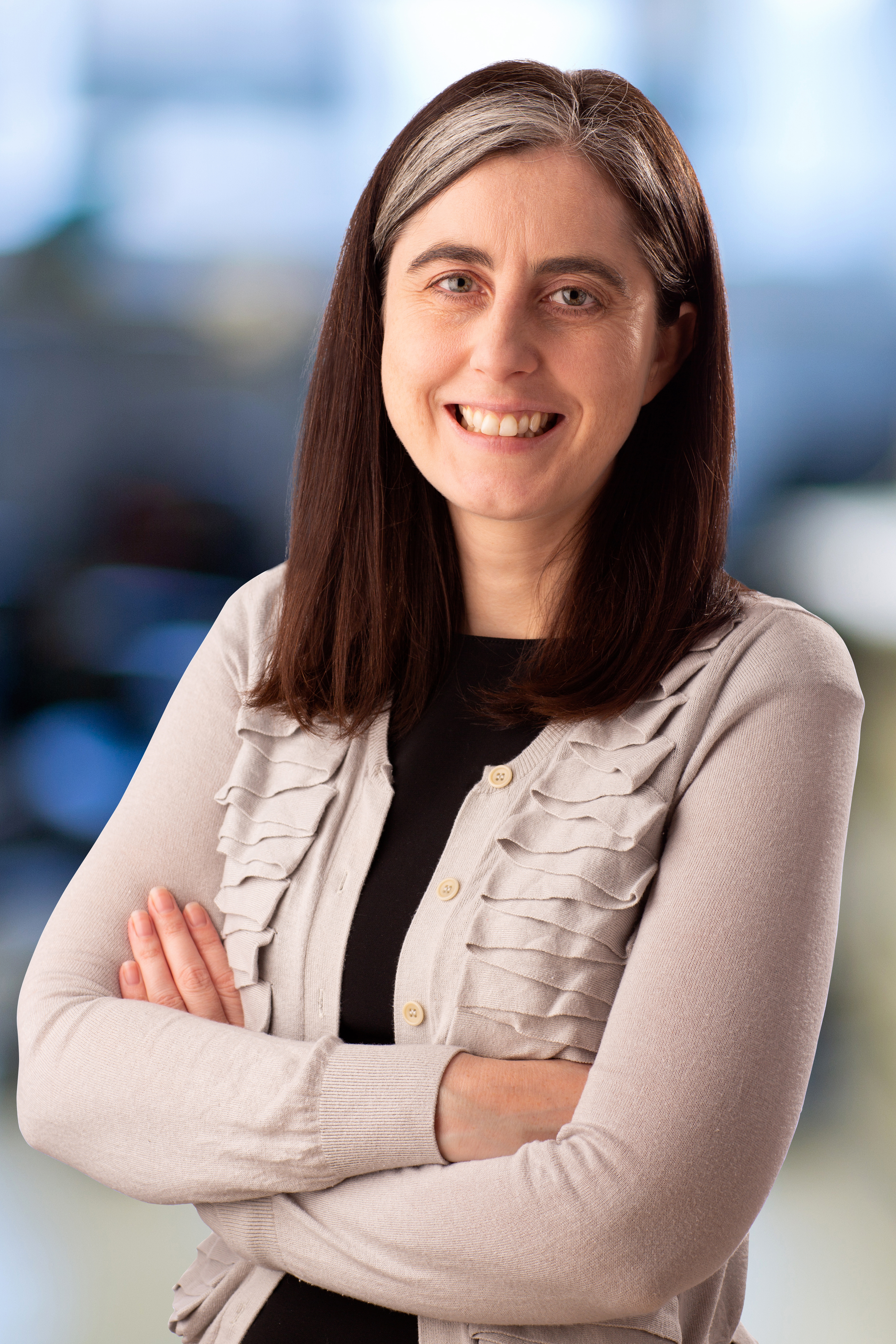
- Education: University of Manchester (B.S.) University College London (Ph.D.) Stanford University (Postdoctoral Fellow)
- Known for: Role of astrocytes in brain plasticity
- Awards: Ben Barres Early Career Acceleration Award - Chan Zuckerberg Initiative, Pew Scholar, Ellison Medical Foundation Scholar, Dana Foundation Award, Whitehall Foundation Award
- Scientific career
- Fields: Astrocyte Biology Molecular Neurobiology
- Institutions: Salk Institute for Biological Studies
- Doctoral advisor: David Attwell
- Other academic advisors: Ben Barres

Nicola J. Allen is a British neuroscientist. Allen studies the role of astrocytes in brain development, homeostasis, and aging. Her work uncovered the critical roles these cells play in brain plasticity and disease. Allen is currently an associate professor at the Salk Institute for Biological Studies and Hearst Foundation Development Chair.

== Education ==
Allen conducted her undergraduate studies in Anatomical Sciences at the University of Manchester in England. She completed her doctoral degree in Neuroscience at University College London in the United Kingdom in the lab of David Attwell. She was a postdoctoral researcher in the lab of Ben Barres at Stanford University.

== Research ==
Allen's research focuses on how astrocytes regulate synapses in the brain during disorders such as Alzheimer's disease. In 2012 while she was a postdoc in the lab of Ben Barres, she showed that astrocytes secrete glypican 4 and 6, which is needed to create glutamatergic synapses between neurons. She later expanded the research on glypican 4, showing that it is needed for the postsynaptic neurons to receive inputs. Allen also showed that astrocytes excrete a protein called Chrdl1, which helps the maturation of the brain. It also increased neuroplasticity in the brains of mice.

Allen uses ribo-tagging, which is a molecular technique to determine which proteins are made by the ribosomes. This technique allowed her to show that astrocytes make a protein that encourages the breakdown of connections between neurons.

== Awards and honours ==
- Ben Barres Early Career Acceleration Award from the Chan Zuckerberg Initiative (CZI) - 2018
- Pew Scholar - 2015
- Human Frontier Science Program (HFSP) Long Term Fellowship - 2005–2008
- European Molecular Biology Organisation (EMBO) Long Term Fellowship - 2004–2005
- Wellcome Trust PhD Fellowship - 1999–2003

== Selected publications ==
- Allen, Nicola J.; Eroglu, Cagla (2017). "Cell Biology of Astrocyte-Synapse Interactions". Neuron. 96 (3): 697–708. doi:10.1016/j.neuron.2017.09.056. ISSN 0896-6273. PMC 5687890. PMID 29096081.
- Allen, Nicola J.; Bennett, Mariko L.; Foo, Lynette C.; Wang, Gordon X.; Chakraborty, Chandrani; Smith, Stephen J.; Barres, Ben A. (2012). "Astrocyte glypicans 4 and 6 promote formation of excitatory synapses via GluA1 AMPA receptors". Nature. 486 (7403): 410–414. Bibcode:2012Natur.486..410A. doi:10.1038/nature11059. ISSN 1476-4687. PMC 3383085. PMID 22722203.
- Allen, Nicola J.; Attwell, David (2002). "Modulation of ASIC channels in rat cerebellar purkinje neurons by ischaemia-related signals". The Journal of Physiology. 543 (2): 521–529. doi:10.1113/jphysiol.2002.020297. ISSN 1469-7793. PMC 2290513. PMID 12205186.
