= TRAPPC14 =

Protein-coding gene found in humans

Identifiers
- Aliases: TRAPPC14, trafficking protein particle complex subunit 14, microtubule associated protein 11, chromosome 7 open reading frame 43, C7orf43, MCPH25, MAP11
- External IDs: OMIM: 618350; MGI: 2385896; GeneCards: TRAPPC14

Gene location (Human)
Chr.	Chromosome 7 (human)
Band	7q22.1	Start	100,154,420 bp
Band	7q22.1	End	100,158,723 bp

Gene location (Mouse)
Chr.	Chromosome 5 (mouse)
Band	5|5 G2	Start	138,257,918 bp
Band	5|5 G2	End	138,262,295 bp
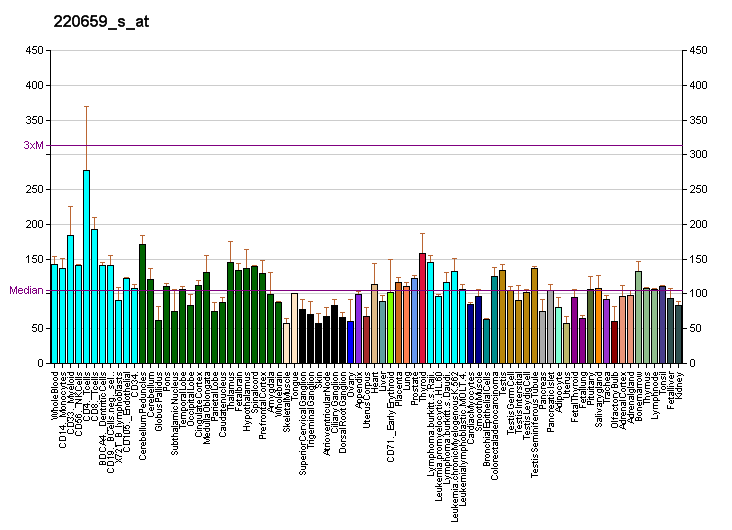
RNA expression pattern
Bgee	Human / Mouse (ortholog); Top expressed in: mucosa of transverse colon; granulocyte; right testis; left testis; spleen; right hemisphere of cerebellum; blood; anterior pituitary; skin of abdomen; skin of leg / Top expressed in: granulocyte; bone marrow; hypothalamus; spleen; striatum of neuraxis; olfactory bulb; cerebellum; cerebellar cortex; primary visual cortex; adrenal gland; More reference expression data
BioGPS	More reference expression data
Gene ontology
Molecular function	alpha-tubulin binding
Cellular component	microtubule organizing center; plasma membrane; intracellular membrane-bounded organelle; cytoplasm; spindle; cytoskeleton; midbody; mitotic spindle
Biological process	regulation of cell population proliferation
Sources:Amigo / QuickGO
Orthologs
Databases	NCBI: entry; OMA: entry
Species	Human	Mouse
Entrez	55262	231807
Ensembl	ENSG00000146826	ENSMUSG00000036948
UniProt	Q8WVR3	Q3UTZ3
RefSeq (mRNA)	NM_018275; NM_001303470	NM_153161
RefSeq (protein)	NP_001290399; NP_060745	NP_694801
Location (UCSC)	Chr 7: 100.15 – 100.16 Mb	Chr 5: 138.26 – 138.26 Mb
PubMed search
- Wikidata
View/Edit Human	View/Edit Mouse

Trafficking protein particle complex subunit 14 (TRAPPC14) also known as MAP11 (microtubule-associated protein 11) is a protein that in human is encoded by the gene TRAPPC14 (previously C7orf43). This protein is a subunit of the vesicle tethering TRAPP II complex.

== Gene Locus ==
In humans, MAP11 is located in the long arm of human chromosome 7 (7q22.1), and is on the negative (antisense) strand. Genes located around C7orf43 include GAL3ST4, LAMTOR4, GPC2. In humans, C7orf43 has 9 detected common single-nucleotide polymorphisms (SNPs), all of which are located in non-coding regions and thus do not affect amino acid sequence.

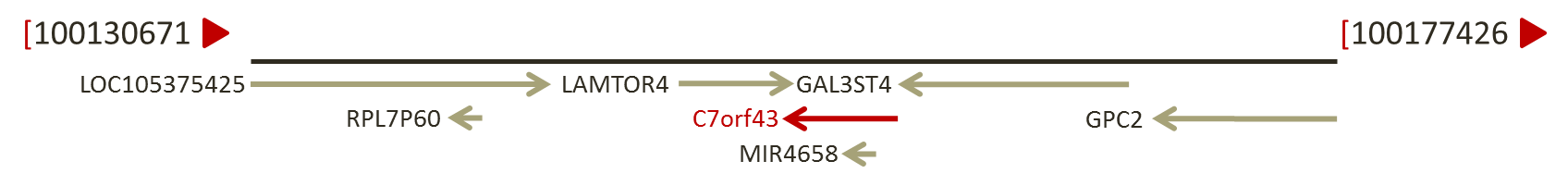
Gene neighbourhood of C7orf43 in human chromosome 7

== mRNA ==
=== Splice variants ===
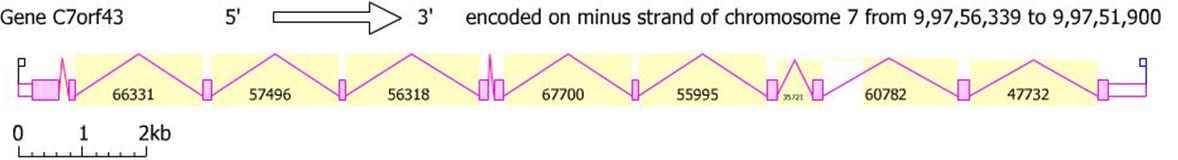
Primary transcript of C7orf43 isoform 1, showing 11 exons and 10 introns (NCBI Aceview:C7orf43)

MAP11 encodes 2 isoforms, the longest being C7orf43 isoform 1, which is 2585 base pairs long and has with 11 exons and 10 introns. C7orf43 isoform 1 encodes a protein that is 580 amino acids long and only has one polyadenylation site. C7orf43 isoform 2 is 2085 base pairs long and encodes a protein of 311 amino acids. Two additional isoforms has been reported on several occasions, encoding for proteins with 199 and 206 amino acids.

=== Tissue expression ===
MAP11 has a widespread moderate expression with tissue to tissue variability in humans and across mammalian species. The mouse C7orf43 ortholog has been shown to be ubiquitously expressed in the brain, as well as in the mouse embryonic central nervous system.

=== Regulations ===
MAP11 has one promoter region upstream of its transcription site, as predicted by Genomatix. This promoter is 657 base pairs long and is located at position 99756182 to 99756838 in the negative strand of chromosome 7. There are several transcription factor binding sites located in this promoter, including binding sites for zinc fingers and Kruppel-like transcription factors. The top 20 transcription binding sites as predicted by the ElDorado from Genomatix is listed in the following table.

Detailed Family Information	Detailed Matrix Information	Start Position	End Position	Anchor Position	Strand	Matrix Similarity Score	Sequence
Brachyury gene, mesoderm developmental factor	T-box transcription factor TBX20	617	645	631	+	1	agcagccggAGGTgtcgggaccctctgga
C2H2 zinc finger transcription factors 2	KRAB-containing zinc finger protein 300	596	618	607	+	1	ccggccgCCCCagccgggcgcag
Fork head domain factors	Alternative splicing variant of FOXP1, activated in ESCs	37	53	45	-	1	aaaaaaaAACAaccctt
Pleomorphic adenoma gene	Pleomorphic adenoma gene 1	411	433	422	-	1	gaGGGGgcggggtcccgctgctc
Pleomorphic adenoma gene	Pleomorphic adenoma gene 1	464	486	475	-	1	gaGGGGgcgtggccgccgaggcc
RNA polymerase II transcription factor II B	Transcription factor II B (TFIIB) recognition element	197	203	200	+	1	ccgCGCC
TGF-beta induced apoptosis proteins	Cysteine-serine-rich nuclear protein 1 (AXUD1, AXIN1 up-regulated 1)	73	79	76	-	1	AGAGtga
GC-Box factors SP1/GC	Stimulating protein 1, ubiquitous zinc finger transcription factor	418	434	426	-	0.998	ggaggGGGCggggtccc
Human and murine ETS1 factors	Ets variant 3	486	506	496	-	0.996	gagaaacaGGAAgcggaaggg
Krueppel like transcription factors	Gut-enriched Krueppel-like factor / KLF4	469	485	477	-	0.994	agggggcGTGGccgccg
Two-handed zinc finger homeodomain transcription factors	AREB6 (Atp1a1 regulatory element binding factor 6)	495	507	501	+	0.994	ttcctGTTTctct
Zinc finger transcription factor RU49, zinc finger proliferation 1 - Zipro1	Zinc finger transcription factor RU49 (zinc finger proliferation 1 - Zipro 1). RU49 exhibits a strong preference for binding to tandem repeats of the minimal RU49 consensus binding site.	522	528	525	+	0.994	cAGTAcc
Krueppel like transcription factors	Core promoter-binding protein (CPBP) with 3 Krueppel-type zinc fingers (KLF6, ZF9)	418	434	426	-	0.992	ggagGGGGcggggtccc
C2H2 zinc finger transcription factors 7	Zinc finger protein 263, ZKSCAN12 (zinc finger protein with KRAB and SCAN domains 12)	425	439	432	+	0.99	cgccccCTCCtccac
C2H2 zinc finger transcription factors 6	Zinc finger and BTB domain containing 7, Proto-oncogene FBI-1, Pokémon (secondary DNA binding preference)	252	264	258	-	0.989	caaGACCaccctg
Krueppel like transcription factors	Kruppel-like factor 7 (ubiquitous, UKLF)	416	432	424	-	0.989	agggGGCGgggtcccgc
GC-Box factors SP1/GC	Sp4 transcription factor	471	487	479	-	0.986	ggagggGGCGtggccgc
Krueppel like transcription factors	Gut-enriched Krueppel-like factor	137	153	145	+	0.986	gggctcAAAGgatcctc
Krueppel like transcription factors	Krueppel-like factor 2 (lung) (LKLF)	641	657	649	-	0.986	cgctaGGGTgggtccag
Human and murine ETS1 factors	Ets variant 1	6	26	16	-	0.984	ttctcccaGGAAgattctcca

== Protein ==
=== Composition and Domains ===
The human protein MAP11 has an isoelectric point of 8.94. MAP11 also has a glycine-rich region spanning amino acids 54 through 134. Analysis using the SAPS tool from the SDSC Biology Workbench showed this glycine-rich region to not be conserved in terms of specific glycine residue positions, but is well conserved in overall glycine content in mammals and reptiles, although not in bony fishes. C7orf43 is mostly uncharged, and this neutral charge distribution is conserved in mammals and reptiles, but bony fishes have at least one negative charge cluster C7orf43 is predicted to have no signal peptide in its first 70 amino acid residues. However, it is predicted to have a vacuolar targeting motif starting at residue 258 in the human protein. This vacuolar targeting motif is shown to be conserved throughout mammals, reptiles, birds, amphibians, and bony fishes.

=== Evolutionary history ===
The MAP11 protein has no paralogs in humans. However, C7orf43 orthologs can be found to be highly conserved in mammals, reptiles, and several species of bony fishes. C7orf43 is also conserved in birds, although several bird species lack parts of the N-terminus. No C7orf43 orthologs can be found outside the animal kingdom. The following table lists representative C7orf43 orthologs across multiple animal classes.

==== Strict orthologs ====
No.	Species	Common name	Date of Divergence (MYA)	Accession No.	E-value	Length (aa)	Identity (%)	Similarity (%)
1	Homo sapiens	Human	-	NP_060745.3	0.0	580	100	100
2	Pan troglodytes	Common Chimpanzee	6.3	XP_009452032	0.0	580	99	100
3	Macaca mulatta	Macaque	29.0	XP_001102238	0.0	580	99	99
4	Cavia porcellus	Guinea pig	92.3	XP_003470051	0.0	580	98	98
5	Sus scrofa	Wild boar	94.2	XP_003124386	0.0	580	98	99
6	Odobenus rosmarus divergens	Walrus	94.2	XP_004399075	0.0	580	98	98
7	Tursiops truncatus	Common bottlenose dolphin	94.2	XP_004315199	0.0	582	92	93
8	Echinops telfairi	Lesser hedgehog tenrec	98.7	XP_004705644	0.0	581	95	97
9	Dasypus novemcinctus	Nine-banded armadillo	104.2	XP_004457234	0.0	580	97	98
10	Monodelphis domestica	Gray short-tailed opossum	162.6	XP_001367097	0.0	568	89	92
11	Chrysemys picta bellii	Painted turtle	296.0	XP_008175974	0.0	572	76	83
12	Alligator mississippiensis	American alligator	296.0	XP_006266384	0.0	582	75	82
13	Pelodiscus sinensis	Chinese softshell turtle	296.0	XP_006127325	0.0	569	73	81
14	Xenopus tropicalis	Western clawed frog	371.2	NP_001121523	0.0	580	64	74
15	Oncorhynchus mykiss	Rainbow trout	400.1	CDQ84878	0.0	581	64	75
16	Danio rerio	Zebrafish	400.1	XP_001339329	0.0	595	63	74
17	Oryzias latipes	Japanese rice fish	400.1	XP_004076807	0.0	609	62	70
18	Takifugu rubripes	Pufferfish	400.1	XP_003970822	0.0	618	61	71

==== Distant orthologs ====
No.	Species	Common name	Date of Divergence (MYA)	Accession No.	E-value	Length (aa)	Identity (%)	Similarity (%)
1	Nipponia Nippon	Crested ibis	296.0	XP_009472339	0.0	503	80	88
2	Charadrius vociferous	Killdeer	296.0	XP_009892747	0.0	456	82	90
3	Pseudopodoces humilis	Ground tit	296.0	XP_005533426	0.0	600	66	76
4	Latimeria chalumnae	West Indian Ocean coelacanth	414.9	XP_006011612	3E-177	429	65	75
5	Branchiostoma floridae	Florida lancelet	713.2	XP_002592972	9E-67	557	32	46
6	Strongylocentrotus purpuratus	Purple sea urchin	742.9	XP_003727419	3E-46	725	35	51
7	Aplysia californica	California sea slug	782.7	XP_005113015	4E-21	692	25	39
8	Nematostella vectensis	Starlet sea anemone	855.3	XP_001632706	4E-19	494	24	39
9	Trichoplax adhaerens	-	-	XP_002108809	5E-15	645	24	41

=== Post-translational modifications ===
C7orf43 has three phosphorylated sites, Ser 517, Thr 541 and, Ser 546. All three sites are relatively well-conserved throughout mammals, reptiles, birds, amphibians, and bony fishes. The protein has no predicted N-myristoylation, as it has no N-terminal glycine. However, C7orf43 is predicted to have one N-acetylation on a serine residue at the N-terminus.

=== Secondary structure ===
The secondary structure of C7orf43 is yet to be determined. However, C7orf43 is predicted to have no transmembrane domain and to eventually be secreted from the cell. An analysis using the PELE tool from SDSC Biology Workbench predicted mostly beta sheets and random coils that are conserved throughout the strict orthologs. Similarly conserved alpha helix motifs have been predicted, one near the N-terminus and one near the C-terminus.

== Clinical significance ==
While no studies have focused on the characterization of C7orf43, several large-scale screenings have revealed information related to C7orf43 function. A study using FLAG affinity purification mass spectrometry (AP-MS) to profile protein interactions in the Hippo signaling pathway identified C7orf43 as one of the interacting proteins. C7orf43 was found to interact with angiomotin-like protein 2 (AMOTL2), also known as Leman Coiled-Coil Protein (LCCP), a regulator of Hippo signaling. AMOTL2 is also known to be an inhibitor of Wnt signaling, a pathway with known associations to cancer development, and to be a factor for angiogenesis, a process essential to tumour maintenance and metastasis.

Several studies have linked C7orf43 to carcinomic events. Other studies have also linked C7orf43 to carcinomic events. A large-scale yeast two-hybrid experiment identified C7orf43 to be interacting with transmembrane protein 50A (TMEM50A), also known as cervical cancer gene 9 or small membrane protein 1 (SMP1). While the exact function of TMEM50A is unknown, it has been associated with cervical cancer.

C7orf43 has also been identified as a target gene of the transcription factor AP-2 gamma (TFAP2C). TFAP2C has been shown to be involved in the development, differentiation, and oncogenesis of mammary tissues. Specifically, TFAP2C has a role in breast carcinoma through its regulatory effect to ESR1 and ERBB2, both of which are receptors whose aberrations have been associated with breast carcinomas. TFAP2C has also been shown to have an oncogenic role by promotion of cell proliferation and tumour growth in neuroblastoma.

Through its location in the q arm of chromosome 7, C7orf43 has been linked to various diseases. Several diseases have been described as having deletions in the q arm of chromosome 7, among them are myeloid disorders, including acute myelogenous leukemia and myelodysplasia.
