= Dally =

Dally may refer to:

Surname:

- Ann Dally (1929–2007), English author and psychiatrist
- Bill Dally, the Willard R. and Inez Kerr Bell Professor in the Stanford University School of Engineering
- Clarence Madison Dally (1865–1904), American glassblower, assistant to Thomas Edison
- Craig Dally, Republican member of the Pennsylvania House of Representatives for the 138th District
- Frederick Dally (1838–1914), English Canadian photographer
- Hans Dally (1916–1997), highly decorated Hauptmann in the Luftwaffe during World War II
- Jean-Philippe Dally (born 1996), French–Ivorian basketballer
- Marcelin Dally (born 1962), retired Côte d'Ivoire hurdler
- Rashawn Dally (born 1997), Jamaican footballer
- William Dally (1908–1996), American rower who competed in the 1928 Summer Olympics

Given name:

- Dally Duncan (1909–1990), Aberdeen-born football player and manager
- Dally Messenger (1883–1959), Australian rugby union and rugby league footballer
- Dally O'Brien (1918–1996), Australian rules footballer
- Dally Randriantefy (born 1977), former professional female tennis player

Places:

- Dally Castle, ruined 13th century stone motte and bailey fortress in Northumberland, England

Biochemistry:

- Dally (gene), a gene that encodes an HS-modified proteoglycan in "Drosophila melanogaster"

Other:

- Dilly Dally, Canadian alternative rock band
- Dally M Awards, the official annual player awards for the National Rugby League competition
- Dally or Dallie is a generally neutral slang term for a Croatian New Zealander
- Dallie, a parasite kaiju from the Japanese television series Ultraseven

== See also ==
- Dally in the Alley, Detroit's largest annual community festival
- Don't Dilly Dally on the Way, music hall song
