= Beth Stevens =

Neuroscientist

- Born: 1970 (age 55–56); Brockton, Massachusetts, U.S.
- Education: Northeastern University (BS); University of Maryland (PhD)
- Known for: Microglia and complement receptor-based synaptic pruning mechanisms
- Spouse: Rob Graham
- Scientific career
- Fields: Neuroscience; Neuroimmunology
- Workplaces: Boston Children's Hospital; Harvard Medical School
- Thesis: Activity-dependent regulation of Schwann cell development by extracellular ATP (2003)
- Doctoral advisor: Roger W. Davenport; R. Douglas Fields
- Other academic advisors: Ben Barres
- Notable students: Dorothy P. Schafer

Beth Stevens (born 1970) is a Professor in the Department of Neurology at Harvard Medical School and the F. M. Kirby Neurobiology Center at Boston Children’s Hospital. She has helped to identify the role of microglia and complement proteins in the "pruning" or removal of synaptic cells during brain development, and has also determined that the impaired or abnormal microglial function could be responsible for diseases like autism, schizophrenia, and Alzheimer's.

In 2012, Stevens’s team published evidence that microglia 'eat' synapses, especially those that are weak and unused. These findings pinned down a new role for microglia in wiring the brain, indicating that adult neural circuitry is determined not only by nerve cells but also by the brain’s immune cells. This helped to explain how the brain, which starts out with a surplus of neurons, trims some of the excess neurons away. Neuron named the paper its most influential publication of 2012. In 2019, Stevens became a member of the National Academy of Medicine.

== Early life and education ==
Beth Stevens was born in 1970 in Brockton, Massachusetts. Her mother taught elementary school, and her father was the school's principal.

Stevens earned a B.S. in Biology from Northeastern University (1993), where she worked full-time in medical labs through Northeastern's co-op program. Following graduation, Stevens got a job with neuroscientist R. Douglas Fields, who had a lab at the National Institutes of Health (NIH). She earned a Ph.D. in Neuroscience from the University of Maryland, College Park (2003). Stevens completed her postdoctoral fellowship with Ben Barres at the Stanford University School of Medicine in 2008. There, she carried out research on the role of astrocytes and in synapse formation by triggering neurons to produce a protein that tags "eat-me" signals on immature synapses instead of mature ones.

== Research ==
Currently, Stevens is a Research Associate in Neurology at Boston's Children's Hospital, Associate Professor of Neurology at Harvard Medical School, and institute member of the Broad Institute of MIT and Harvard. She is the Principal Investigator of the Stevens Lab, which "seeks to understand how neuron-glia communication facilitates the formation, elimination and plasticity of synapses—the points of communication between neurons—during both healthy development and disease." Stevens's work has led her to the discovery of different roles of microglia and their relevance in neurological diseases.

In 2007, Stevens discovered that proteins of the classical complement pathway were required for synapse elimination. She has explored the role of complement components in schizophrenia, Alzheimer's disease, and glaucoma.

Stevens and former postdoc Dorothy P. Schafer demonstrated that microglia participate in regulation of neuronal activity by phagocytosing complement-tagged synapses. As the resident phagocytes of the central nervous system (CNS), microglia survey their local environment, clear cellular debris, and make contact with neurons to aid in synaptic pruning during development and learning. They proposed a "quad-partite" expansion of the tripartite synapse model by including microglia as functional participants in developing and mature synapses.

Stevens has found that microglia play a role in synapse loss in a range of disease states, including West Nile virus infection and neurodegenerative diseases such as Alzheimer's disease, where synapse loss precedes neuron death. Microglia may contribute to disease both by phagocytosing synaptic material and activating neurotoxic astrocytes. Her research indicates that neurodegenerative diseases may represent a local reactivation of microglial pruning pathways that are beneficial during development but detrimental in the mature brain. Stevens has also identified microglia as a contributor to Rett syndrome progression independent of MECP2 mutation, which is known to cause the disease.

== Awards ==
Stevens has received recognition for her discoveries and is the recipient of several awards, including the following:

- John Merck Fund
- Presidential Early Career Award for Scientists and Engineers (PECASE)
- Smith Family Award for Excellence in Biomedical Research
- Dana Foundation Award (Brain and Immunoimaging)
- Ellison Medical Foundation New Scholar in Aging Award
- MacArthur Fellows Program

Stevens received the MacArthur Foundation's award of $625,000 in order to continue her studies on brain cells. Out of the 24 recipients of the award only 9, including Stevens, were women. Stevens received the Presidential Early Career Award for Scientists and Engineers (PECASE) in 2012, which is awarded to young scientists by the US government. In October 2015, she gave one of 4 Presidential lectures at the annual meeting of the Society for Neuroscience, the world's largest gathering of neuroscientists. She shared this honor with 3 other neuroscientists, two of which are Nobel laureates.

Stevens was named an HHMI Investigator in 2018. HHMI Investigators are established researchers who work across the United States.

== Personal life ==
Stevens is married to Rob Graham.
