= Ben Barres =

American neurobiologist (1954–2017)

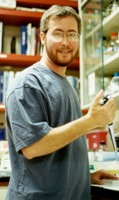
- Born: September 13, 1954; West Orange, New Jersey, U.S.
- Died: December 27, 2017 (aged 63); Stanford, California, U.S.
- Education: Massachusetts Institute of Technology (BS); Dartmouth College (MD); Harvard University (PhD)
- Scientific career
- Fields: Neuroscience
- Workplaces: Stanford University
- Doctoral advisors: David Corey; Martin Raff
- Doctoral students: Beth Stevens; Cagla Eroglu

Benjamin Arthur Barres (born September 13, 1954 – December 27, 2017) was an American neurobiologist at Stanford University. His research focused on the interaction between neurons and glial cells in the nervous system. Beginning in 2008, he was chair of the Neurobiology Department at Stanford University School of Medicine. He transitioned to male in 1997, and became the first openly transgender scientist in the National Academy of Sciences in 2013. Barres is also known for his pioneering activism for equal opportunity in science, often citing his experiences as both a male and female scientist.

== Early life and education ==
Barres was born on September 13, 1954, in West Orange, New Jersey, and was assigned female at birth. As a child, his salesman father and homemaker mother saw him as a tomboy. He later recalled: "Internally I felt strongly that I was a boy. This was evident in everything about my behavior." Attending a West Orange school, Barres excelled in mathematics and science.

At the age of 17, he learned that he had been born with Müllerian agenesis, for which he received surgical correction. He obtained a Bachelor of Science in Biology from Massachusetts Institute of Technology (1976), a medical degree (MD) from Dartmouth Medical School (1979), and a residency in neurology at Weill Cornell Medicine. During his residency, Barres noted the lack of knowledge about the causes or cures of neurodegeneration. In studying pathology reports, he noticed a correlation between neural degeneration and irregular patterns of glial cells in the brain and, intrigued, resigned his residency to pursue research in neuroscience at Harvard Medical School. He completed a PhD in neurobiology there in 1990, then did postdoctoral training at University College London under Martin Raff. In 1993, Barres joined the faculty of Neurobiology at the Stanford School of Medicine. After transitioning to male in 1997, Barres published on sexism in the sciences. In 2008, he was appointed to the Chair of Neurobiology at Stanford.

== Research ==
Barres authored or co-authored papers in journals such as Nature Neuroscience, Neuron, Science, and Cell. His research involved study of mammalian glial cells of the central nervous system (CNS), including the exploration of their function and development. Much of his early work was published under his deadname.

His first major discovery was how developing neurons provide signals to the myelinating glial cells called the oligodendrocytes that provide insulation on the axons. Some of his earliest works focussed on vertebrate nervous system development, including how and why many neurons fail to survive shortly after forming connections with their targets. These studies investigated how this programmed cell death, apoptosis, occurred in such a tremendous scale. Additionally, he studied processes such as the prerequisites for and consequences of axon myelination, and the interactions of various signaling molecules such as thyroid-hormone and retinoic acid within the formation of glial cells including oligodendrocytes.

Early in his time at Stanford, Barres discovered the importance of glial cells in the formation, development, maturation, and regeneration of neurons. His lab also discovered and developed methods for the purification and culturing of retinal ganglion cells and the glial cells with which they interact, including the oligodendrocytes and astrocytes of the optic nerve.

Near the turn of the 21st century he continued his study of glial cells and the mechanisms behind their ability to generate new neurons. He studied control of synapses by glia, and the differentiation of astrocytes by endothelial cells. He investigated the role of the protein Id2 in the control of oligodendrocyte development and established that removing this protein led to premature oligodendrocyte maturation.

In the 2010s Barres's research focused on using techniques such as immunopanning, immunohistochemistry, tissue culturing, and patch clamping to: 1) understand the cell-to-cell interactions in the developmental regulation of nodes of Ranvier and myelin sheaths; 2) determine to what extent glial cells play a role in synapse formation and function of synapses; 3) identify the signals that promote retinal ganglia growth and survival, and how such knowledge of these signals could be regenerated post-trauma; 4) identify the functions and developmental mechanisms of gray matter astrocytes. In these objectives, his lab discovered a number of novel glial signals for the induction of myelination, axonal sodium channel clustering, and synapse formation processes. Additionally, his lab characterized these processes and the exact identity of these novel signals.

== Experience of sexism ==
Barres described experiences of gender discrimination at an early age. While he was presenting as female prior to transitioning, he was excluded at schools from the science and mathematics courses that interested him. It was a summer science course at Columbia University in New York City that enabled him to pursue further studies in science. A more serious event happened to his academics in MIT. After solving a difficult math problem that stumped many male students, his professor charged that it was solved for him by a boyfriend. He was the top student in the class, but found it hard to get a willing supervisor for research. He lost a scholarship to a man who had only one publication, while he already had six. While earning a PhD at Harvard, he was told that he was to win a scientific competition, which was evidently between him and one man; the Dean confided to him, "I have read both applications, and it's going to be you; your application is so much better." But the award was given to the male-presenting man, who dropped out of science a year later.

After transitioning, he noticed that people who were not aware of him being transgender treated him with respect much more than when he presented as a woman. After delivering his first seminar as a man, one scientist was overheard to comment, "Ben Barres gave a great seminar today, but his work is much better than his sister's [believing work published under his deadname to be his sister's] work." In 2012, he recollected the events of his sex change:

When I decided to change sex 15 years ago I didn't have role models to point to. I thought that I had to decide between identity and career. I changed sex thinking my career might be over. The alternative choice I seriously contemplated at the time was suicide, as I could not go on as Barbara.

Barres was critical of economist Lawrence Summers and others who have claimed that one reason there are fewer women than men in science and engineering professorships might be that fewer women than men had the very high levels of "intrinsic aptitude" that such jobs required. He spoke and wrote openly about being a trans man and his experiences transitioning gender identity in 1997, and his experiences of being treated differently as a female scientist versus a male scientist.

== Death ==
Barres died on December 27, 2017, some 20 months after being diagnosed with pancreatic cancer, at his home in Palo Alto, California. He was survived by two sisters and a brother.

In a recollection of his life, he said:

I lived life on my terms: I wanted to switch genders, and I did. I wanted to be a scientist, and I was. I wanted to study glia, and I did that too. I stood up for what I believed in and I like to think I made an impact, or at least opened the door for the impact to occur. I have zero regrets and I'm ready to die. I've truly had a great life.

== Awards and honors ==
Barres's research awards include a Life Sciences Research Fellowship, the Klingenstein Fellowship Award, a McKnight Investigator Award, and a Searle Scholar Award. He has also won teaching awards: the Kaiser Award for Excellence in Teaching, and the Kaiser Award for Innovative and Outstanding Contributions to Medical Education. In 2008 he received the Mika Salpeter Lifetime Achievement Award. He is an inducted member of the Reeve Foundation International Research Consortium on Spinal Cord Injury. He is a co-founder of Annexon Biosciences, Inc., a company making drugs to block neurodegeneration in Alzheimer's and other neurological diseases. He became a member and elected Fellow of the American Association for the Advancement of Science in 2011. In 2013 he was elected to the National Academy of Sciences, becoming the first openly transgender member. Along with biochemist Tom Jessell, he was awarded the Ralph W. Gerard Prize in Neuroscience at the Society for Neuroscience (SfN) 2016 conference in San Diego.

== Key publications ==
=== Research articles ===
- Goldberg, J. L.; Barres, B. A. (2000). "The relationship between neuronal survival and regeneration". Annual Review of Neuroscience. 23: 579–612. doi:10.1146/annurev.neuro.23.1.579. PMID 10845076.
- Barres, Ben A; Yves-Alain Barde (2000). "Neuronal and glial cell biology". Current Opinion in Neurobiology. 10 (5): 642–648. doi:10.1016/S0959-4388(00)00134-3. ISSN 0959-4388. PMID 11084327. S2CID 9302781.
- Barres, B. A. (2005). "Arrogance imperils plans for change at Harvard". Nature. 434 (7034): 697. Bibcode:2005Natur.434..697B. doi:10.1038/434697a. PMID 15815603.
- Barres, Ben A. (2006). "Does gender matter?". Nature. 442 (7099): 133–136. Bibcode:2006Natur.442..133B. doi:10.1038/442133a. PMID 16848004. S2CID 5211326.
- Barres, B (2008). "The Mystery and Magic of Glia: A Perspective on Their Roles in Health and Disease". Neuron. 60 (3): 430–440. doi:10.1016/j.neuron.2008.10.013. ISSN 0896-6273. PMID 18995817.*Barres, Ben A. (2010). "Neuro Nonsense". PLOS Biology. 8 (12) e1001005. doi:10.1371/journal.pbio.1001005. PMC 3001899.
- Dugas, Jason C.; Cuellar, Trinna L.; Scholze, Anja; Ason, Brandon; Ibrahim, Adiljan; Emery, Ben; Zamanian, Jennifer L.; Foo, Lynette C.; McManus, Michael T.; Barres, Ben A. (2010). "Dicer1 and miR-219 Are Required for Normal Oligodendrocyte Differentiation and Myelination". Neuron. 65 (5): 597–611. doi:10.1016/j.neuron.2010.01.027. PMC 2843397. PMID 20223197.
- Eroglu, C.; Barres, B.A. (2010). "Regulation of synaptic connectivity by glia". Nature. 468 (7321): 223–31. Bibcode:2010Natur.468..223E. doi:10.1038/nature09612. PMC 4431554. PMID 21068831.
- Foo, Lynette C.; Allen, Nicola J.; Bushong, Eric A.; Ventura, P. Britten; Chung, Won-Suk; Zhou, Lu; Cahoy, John D.; Daneman, Richard; Zong, Hui; Ellisman, Mark H.; Barres, Ben A. (2011). "Development of a Method for the Purification and Culture of Rodent Astrocytes". Neuron. 71 (5): 799–811. doi:10.1016/j.neuron.2011.07.022. PMC 3172573. PMID 21903074.
- Stephan, Alexander H.; Barres, Ben A.; Stevens, Beth (2012). "The complement system: an unexpected role in synaptic pruning during development and disease". Annual Review of Neuroscience. 35 (1): 369–389. doi:10.1146/annurev-neuro-061010-113810. PMID 22715882. S2CID 2309037.
- Schafer, Dorothy P.; Lehrman, Emily K.; Kautzman, Amanda G.; Koyama, Ryuta; Mardinly, Alan R.; Yamasaki, Ryo; Ransohoff, Richard M.; Greenberg, Michael E.; Barres, Ben A.; Stevens, Beth (2012). "Microglia Sculpt Postnatal Neural Circuits in an Activity and Complement-Dependent Manner". Neuron. 74 (4): 691–705. doi:10.1016/j.neuron.2012.03.026. PMC 3528177. PMID 22632727.
- Barres, Ben A. (2013). "How to Pick a Graduate Advisor". Neuron. 80 (2): 275–279. doi:10.1016/j.neuron.2013.10.005. PMID 24139033.
- Clarke, L. E.; Barres, B. A. (2013). "Emerging roles of astrocytes in neural circuit development". Nature Reviews Neuroscience. 14 (5): 311–21. doi:10.1038/nrn3484. PMC 4431630. PMID 23595014.
- Knowland, Daniel; Arac, Ahmet; Sekiguchi, Kohei J.; Hsu, Martin; Lutz, Sarah E.; Perrino, John; Steinberg, Gary K.; Barres, Ben A.; Nimmerjahn, Axel; Agalliu, Dritan (2014). "Stepwise Recruitment of Transcellular and Paracellular Pathways Underlies Blood-Brain Barrier Breakdown in Stroke". Neuron. 82 (3): 603–617. doi:10.1016/j.neuron.2014.03.003. PMC 4016169. PMID 24746419.
- Liddelow, S. A.; Barres, B. A. (2017). "Reactive Astrocytes: Production, Function, and Therapeutic Potential". Immunity. 46 (6): 957–967. doi:10.1016/j.immuni.2017.06.006. PMID 28636962.
- Li, Q.; Barres, B. A. (2018). "Microglia and macrophages in brain homeostasis and disease". Nature Reviews Immunology. 18 (4): 225–242. doi:10.1038/nri.2017.125. PMID 29151590. S2CID 3290345.
- Guttenplan, Kevin A.; Weigel, Maya K.; Adler, Drew I.; Couthouis, Julien; Liddelow, Shane A.; Gitler, Aaron D.; Barres, Ben A. (2020). "Knockout of reactive astrocyte activating factors slows disease progression in an ALS mouse model". Nature Communications. 11 (1): 3753. Bibcode:2020NatCo..11.3753G. doi:10.1038/s41467-020-17514-9. PMC 7385161. PMID 32719333.
- Yao, Maojin; Ventura, P. Britten; Jiang, Ying; Rodriguez, Fausto J.; Wang, Lixin; Perry, Justin S. A.; Yang, Yibo; Wahl, Kelsey; Crittenden, Rowena B.; Bennett, Mariko L.; Qi, Lin; Gong, Cong-Cong; Li, Xiao-Nan; Barres, Ben A.; Bender, Timothy P.; Ravichandran, Kodi S.; Janes, Kevin A.; Eberhart, Charles G.; Zong, Hui (2020). "Astrocytic trans-Differentiation Completes a Multicellular Paracrine Feedback Loop Required for Medulloblastoma Tumor Growth". Cell. 180 (3): 502–520.e19. doi:10.1016/j.cell.2019.12.024. PMC 7259679. PMID 31983537.

=== Books ===
- Barres, Ben (2018). Critical Role of Glia in Brain Development. Morgan & Claypool. ISBN 978-1-61504-081-0.
- Barres, Ben (2018). The Autobiography of a Transgender Scientist. MIT Press. ISBN 978-0-262-03911-6.

== Legacy ==
In 2022, director–producer Pamela B. Green launched a Kickstarter campaign for Ask The Question, a feature biopic about Ben Barres.

== See also ==
- Matilda effect
