= Glypican 3 =

Protein-coding gene in the species Homo sapiens

GPC3

Identifiers
- Aliases: GPC3, DGSX, GTR2-2, MXR7, OCI-5, SDYS, SGB, SGBS, SGBS1, Glypican 3
- External IDs: OMIM: 300037; MGI: 104903; GeneCards: GPC3

Gene location (Human)
| Chr. | X chromosome (human) |
| Band | Xq26.2 | Start | 133,535,745 bp |
| Band | Xq26.2 | End | 133,987,100 bp |

Gene location (Mouse)
| Chr. | X chromosome (mouse) |
| Band | X|X A5 | Start | 51,361,303 bp |
| Band | X|X A5 | End | 51,702,827 bp |
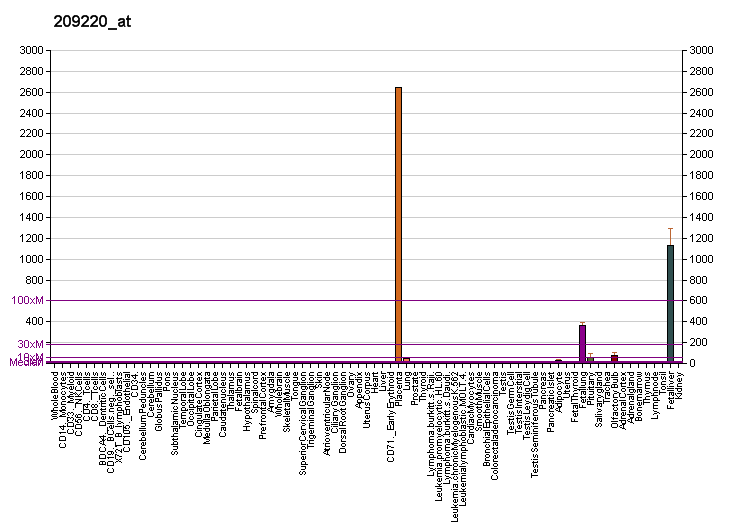
RNA expression pattern
| Bgee | Human / Mouse (ortholog); Top expressed in: upper lobe of left lung; right lung; tibial nerve; placenta; subcutaneous adipose tissue; anterior pituitary; cartilage tissue; right coronary artery; lower lobe of lung; left coronary artery / Top expressed in: umbilical cord; abdominal wall; mandibular prominence; tail of embryo; genital tubercle; maxillary prominence; yolk sac; efferent ductule; Gonadal ridge; hand; More reference expression data |
| BioGPS | More reference expression data |
Gene ontology
| Molecular function | peptidase inhibitor activity; protein binding; peptidyl-dipeptidase inhibitor activity; heparan sulfate proteoglycan binding |
| Cellular component | membrane; anchored component of plasma membrane; plasma membrane; integral component of plasma membrane; extracellular region; lysosomal lumen; Golgi lumen; anchored component of membrane; lysosome; extracellular space; endoplasmic reticulum lumen; intrinsic component of plasma membrane; collagen-containing extracellular matrix |
| Biological process | body morphogenesis; positive regulation of glucose import; bone mineralization; negative regulation of peptidase activity; negative regulation of growth; negative regulation of smoothened signaling pathway; positive regulation of protein catabolic process; positive regulation of smoothened signaling pathway; cell proliferation involved in metanephros development; lung development; kidney development; osteoclast differentiation; anatomical structure morphogenesis; mesenchymal cell proliferation involved in ureteric bud development; mesonephric duct morphogenesis; coronary vasculature development; retinoid metabolic process; cell proliferation involved in kidney development; positive regulation of endocytosis; branching involved in ureteric bud morphogenesis; glycosaminoglycan catabolic process; glycosaminoglycan biosynthetic process; negative regulation of epithelial cell proliferation; positive regulation of BMP signaling pathway; animal organ morphogenesis; regulation of growth; positive regulation of Wnt signaling pathway, planar cell polarity pathway; anterior/posterior axis specification; negative regulation of canonical Wnt signaling pathway; negative regulation of cell population proliferation; embryonic hindlimb morphogenesis; post-translational protein modification; regulation of signal transduction; response to bacterium |
Sources:Amigo / QuickGO
Orthologs
| Databases | NCBI: entry; OMA: entry |
| Species | Human | Mouse |
| Entrez | 2719 | 14734 |
| Ensembl | ENSG00000147257 | ENSMUSG00000055653 |
| UniProt | P51654 | Q8CFZ4 |
| RefSeq (mRNA) | NM_004484; NM_001164617; NM_001164618; NM_001164619 | NM_016697 |
| RefSeq (protein) | NP_001158089; NP_001158090; NP_001158091; NP_004475; NP_004475.1 | NP_057906 |
| Location (UCSC) | Chr X: 133.54 – 133.99 Mb | Chr X: 51.36 – 51.7 Mb |
| PubMed search |
- Wikidata
| View/Edit Human | View/Edit Mouse |

Glypican-3 is a protein that, in humans, is encoded by the GPC3 gene. The GPC3 gene is located on human X chromosome (Xq26) where the most common gene (Isoform 2, GenBank Accession No.: NP_004475) encodes a 70-kDa core protein with 580 amino acids. Three variants have been detected that encode alternatively spliced forms termed Isoforms 1 (NP_001158089), Isoform 3 (NP_001158090) and Isoform 4 (NP_001158091).

== Structure ==
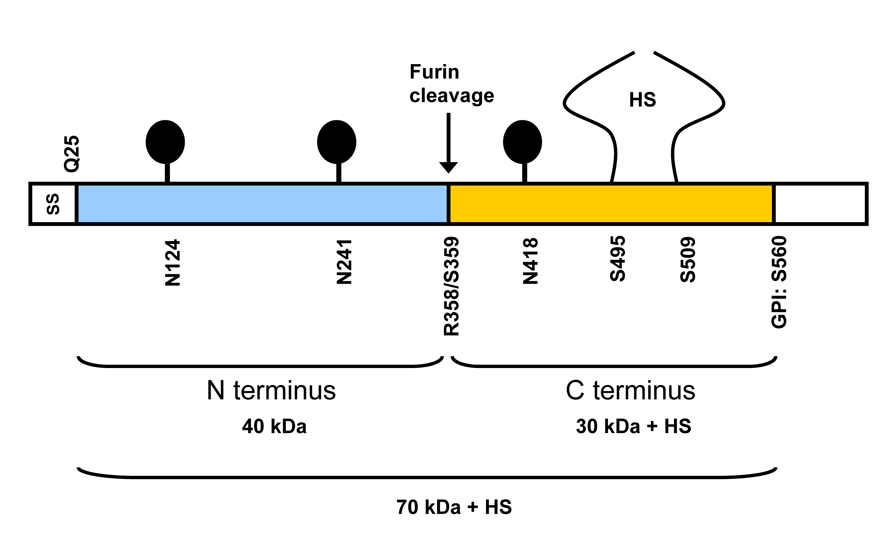
Schematic of the glypican-3 (GPC3) protein

The protein core of GPC3 consists of two subunits, where the N-terminal subunit has a size of ~40 kDa and the C-terminal subunit is ~30 kDa. Six glypicans (GPC1-6) have been identified in mammals. Cell surface heparan sulfate proteoglycans are composed of a membrane-associated protein core substituted with a variable number of heparan sulfate chains.

== Function ==
Members of the glypican-related integral membrane proteoglycan family (GRIPS) contain a core protein anchored to the cytoplasmic membrane via a glycosyl phosphatidylinositol linkage. These proteins may play a role in the control of cell division and growth regulation. GPC3 has been found to regulate Wnt/β-catenin and Yap signaling pathways.

GPC3 interacts with both Wnt and frizzled (FZD) to form a complex and triggers downstream signaling. The core protein of GPC3 may serve as a co-receptor or a receiver for Wnt. A cysteine-rich domain at the N-lobe of GPC3 has been identified as a hydrophobic groove that interacts with Wnt3a. Blocking the Wnt binding domain on GPC3 using the HN3 single domain antibody can inhibit Wnt activation. Wnt also recognizes a heparan sulfate structure on GPC3, which contains IdoA2S and GlcNS6S, and that the 3-O-sulfation in GlcNS6S3S significantly enhances the binding of Wnt to heparan sulfate. GPC3 also modulates Yap signaling. It interacts with FAT1, a potential upstream cell surface receptor of YAP1 in human cells. GPC3 is also found to bind Alpha-fetoprotein in liver cancer.

== Clinical significance ==
=== Disease linkage ===
Deletion mutations in this gene are associated with Simpson–Golabi–Behmel syndrome.

=== Diagnostic utility ===
Glypican 3 immunostaining has utility for differentiating hepatocellular carcinoma (HCC) and dysplastic changes in cirrhotic livers; HCC stains with glypican 3, while liver with dysplastic changes and/or cirrhotic changes does not. Using the YP7 murine monoclonal antibody, GPC3 protein expression is found in HCC, not in normal liver and cholangiocarcinoma. The YP7 murine antibody has been humanized and named as 'hYP7'. GPC3 is also expressed to a lesser degree in melanoma, ovarian clear-cell carcinomas, yolk sac tumors, neuroblastoma, hepatoblastoma, Wilms' tumor cells, and other tumors. However, the significance of GPC3 as a diagnostic tool for human tumors other than HCC is unclear.

=== Therapeutic potential ===
To validate GPC3 as a therapeutic target in liver cancer, the anti-GPC3 therapeutic antibodies GC33, YP7, HN3 and HS20 have been made and widely tested. The laboratory of Dr. Mitchell Ho at the National Cancer Institute, NIH (Bethesda, Maryland, US) has generated YP7 murine monoclonal antibody that recognizes the C-lobe of GPC3 by hybridoma technology. The antibody has been humanized (named hYP7) via antibody engineering for clinical applications. The Ho lab has also identified the human single-domain antibody ('human nanobody') HN3 targeting the N-lobe of GPC3 and the human monoclonal antibody HS20 targeting the heparan sulfate chains on GPC3 by phage display technology. Both HN3 and HS20 antibodies inhibit Wnt signaling in liver cancer cells . The immunotoxins based on HN3, the antibody-drug conjugates based on hYP7 and the T-cell engaging bispecific antibodies derived from YP7 and GC33, have been developed for treating liver cancer. The chimeric antigen receptor (CAR) T cell immunotherapies based on GC33, hYP7 and HN3 are being reported at various stages for treating liver cancer. In mice with xenograft or orthoptic liver tumors, CAR (hYP7) T cells can eliminate GPC3-positive cancer cells, by inducing perforin- and granzyme-mediated cell death and reducing Wnt signaling in tumor cells. CAR (hYP7) T cells are being evaluated at a clinical trial at the NIH.

== See also ==
- Glypican
