= Marc Tessier-Lavigne =

Canadian neuroscientist (born 1959)

Marc Tessier-Lavigne OC FRS FRSC FMedSci
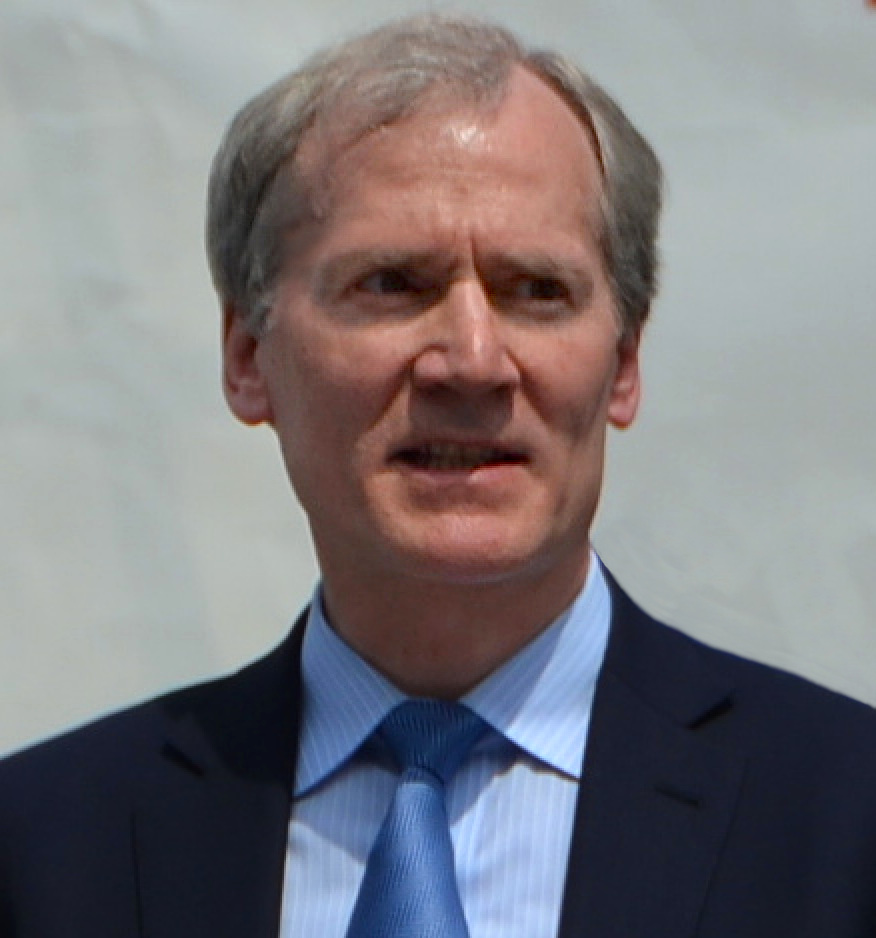
- Tessier-Lavigne in 2013

11th President of Stanford University
- In office September 1, 2016 – August 31, 2023
- Preceded by: John L. Hennessy
- Succeeded by: Richard Saller

10th President of Rockefeller University
- In office March 16, 2011 – September 1, 2016
- Preceded by: Paul Nurse
- Succeeded by: Richard P. Lifton

Personal details
- Born: Marc Trevor Tessier-Lavigne; December 18, 1959 (age 66) Trenton, Ontario, Canada
- Children: 3
- Education: McGill University (BS); New College, Oxford (BA); University College London (PhD)
- Scientific career
- Awards: Gruber Prize in Neuroscience 2020
- Fields: Neuroscience
- Workplaces: University of California, San Francisco; Genentech; Rockefeller University; Stanford University
- Thesis: Processing of Signals and Noise in the Outer Retina of the Salamander (1987)
- Doctoral advisor: David Attwell
- Other academic advisors: Thomas Jessell

Marc Trevor Tessier-Lavigne (born December 18, 1959) is a Canadian-American neuroscientist who is the co-founder, CEO, and chair of the AI biotechnology firm Xaira Therapeutics. He is also a biology professor at Stanford University, where he served as its 11th president from 2016 until his resignation in 2023.

Tessier-Lavigne was formerly executive vice president for research and the chief scientific officer at Genentech. In 2011, he joined the boards of directors of Agios Pharmaceuticals, Regeneron Pharmaceuticals, and Pfizer. In 2014, he joined the board of Juno Therapeutics, and in 2015 he co-founded Denali Therapeutics and joined its board. Tessier-Lavigne was the 10th president of Rockefeller University in New York City from 2011 to 2016, and a professor at the University of California, San Francisco.

In 2022, the Stanford board of trustees opened an investigation into alleged research misconduct by Tessier-Lavigne. The board's investigation found that four papers co-authored by Tessier-Lavigne contained "apparent manipulation of research data", though the report cleared Tessier-Lavigne himself of intentional misconduct. Upon the report's release, Tessier-Lavigne announced his resignation as president of Stanford, effective August 31, 2023.

== Early life and education ==
Tessier-Lavigne was born in Trenton, Ontario, Canada. Aged seven to 17, he grew up in Europe where his father was serving with NATO as part of the Canadian Armed Forces. He was the first in his family to attend university.

In 1980, Tessier-Lavigne earned a BSc in physics from McGill University; in 1982, he took a BA in philosophy and physiology from New College, Oxford; in 1987, he gained a DPhil in physiology from University College London.

Tessier-Lavigne attended Oxford on a Rhodes Scholarship, where he "first encountered the nervous system and fell in love with it" and graduated with first-class honors. His doctoral advisor at University College London was David Attwell. Tessier-Lavigne did postdoctoral research at the MRC Developmental Neurobiology Unit at University College London in 1987 and at the Center for Neurobiology and Behavior at Columbia University with Thomas Jessell from 1987 to 1991.

== Career ==
=== Early career: UCSF, Stanford and Genentech ===
Tessier-Lavigne started his career at the University of California, San Francisco, from 1991 to 2001, and was soon noted for research into the mechanisms of brain wiring during embryonic development. He was a professor of biological sciences at Stanford University from 2001 to 2003. Genentech hired him in 2003 as its senior vice president of Research Drug Discovery. He cited the firm's "potential to create breakthrough therapies for unmet medical needs" as his reason for leaving academia. His brain-development research at Genentech also suggested a possible mechanism relevant to neurodegeneration in Alzheimer's disease. A principal paper from that work, a 2009 study in Nature, was retracted in 2023 after subsequent research showed several of its central conclusions were incorrect and image anomalies were identified.

=== Rockefeller University ===
In 2011, Tessier-Lavigne joined Rockefeller University as its 10th president, succeeding Paul Nurse. He was the first senior scientist to leave Genentech following its 2009 acquisition by Roche, a departure he said was unrelated to the merger; Richard Scheller, his superior at Genentech, described the move as "part of the tradition of exchange between academia and Genentech." As president, he oversaw an institution organized around some 70 independent laboratories whose heads reported directly to him.

Tessier-Lavigne was a member of the Xconomists, an ad hoc team of editorial advisors for the tech news and media company Xconomy.

=== Stanford University ===
On February 4, 2016, Stanford University announced that Tessier-Lavigne would become its 11th president, succeeding John L. Hennessy. As president, Tessier-Lavigne presided over the opening of the Stanford Doerr School of Sustainability, Stanford's first new school since 1948. In 2020, he was recognized as among "pioneers in elucidating the molecular mechanisms that guide axons to their targets, a key step in the formation of neural circuits", and awarded the Gruber Prize in Neuroscience. That November, he was appointed an Officer of the Order of Canada, one of that nation's highest honors, "for his groundbreaking contributions to developmental neuroscience, and his renowned academic leadership and strong advocacy of science."

==== Research misconduct investigation and resignation ====
In November 2022, Stanford announced that its Board of Trustees would oversee an examination of Tessier-Lavigne's publications, after reporting alleged that neurobiology papers he had co-authored contained manipulated images. Microbiologist Elisabeth Bik raised concerns about four papers (in such journals as Science and Nature) co-authored by Tessier-Lavigne, findings confirmed by The Stanford Daily. In February 2023, Tessier-Lavigne declared allegations that he had intentionally falsified his work "utterly false".

On July 19, 2023, the review committee released its report, finding that Tessier-Lavigne "failed to decisively and forthrightly correct mistakes in the scientific record" created by work he had co-authored. The committee found that "in at least four of the five papers [examined], there was apparent manipulation of research data by others", but found "no evidence that Tessier-Lavigne himself manipulated data... nor that he knew about manipulation at the time". The report also criticized the "unusual frequency of manipulation of research data and/or substandard scientific practices from different people, at different times, and in labs overseen by Dr. Tessier-Lavigne at different institutions". It further found that Tessier-Lavigne had notified the journal Science after he was initially informed about the errors in 2015; its editor-in-chief admitted that, due to an internal error, it had failed to publish the corrections for two papers.

Upon the report's release, Tessier-Lavigne announced his resignation as president, effective August 31, 2023, as well as his retraction or correction of five scientific papers.

=== Xaira Therapeutics ===
On April 23, 2024, it was announced that Tessier-Lavigne would become CEO of the AI drug-discovery startup Xaira Therapeutics, of which he is a co-founder and chair.

== Honours ==
- Honorary doctorate, University of Pavia, 2006
- Member of the American Academy of Arts and Sciences, elected 2013
- Elected to the American Philosophical Society, 2017
- Appointed an Officer of the Order of Canada, 2020
- Member of the United States National Academy of Sciences and its Institute of Medicine
- Member of the Council on Foreign Relations
- Fellow of the American Association for the Advancement of Science
- Fellow of the Royal Society of Canada
- Fellow of the Royal Society and the Academy of Medical Sciences in the United Kingdom
- Honorary doctorate, University College London, 2014
- Honorary fellow of New College, Oxford
- The Carnegie Corporation of New York honored Tessier-Lavigne with the 2019 Great Immigrant Award.
- International fellow at the Royal Swedish Academy of Engineering Sciences (IVA) in 2020.
- Golden Plate Award of the American Academy of Achievement presented by Awards Council member Justice Anthony Kennedy in 2022
- Gruber Prize in Neuroscience in 2020

== Personal life ==
Tessier-Lavigne met his wife, Mary Hynes, while he was a postdoctoral fellow at Columbia University. They have three children.

Academic offices
Preceded by Paul Nurse	10th President of Rockefeller University; 2011–2016	Succeeded by Richard P. Lifton
Preceded by John L. Hennessy	11th President of Stanford University; 2016–2023	Succeeded by Richard Saller (Acting); Jonathan Levin
