= Glypican =

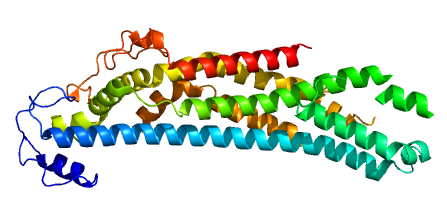
- C-terminally truncated human glypican-1. PDB 4acr

Identifiers
- Symbol: Glypican
- Pfam: PF01153
- InterPro: IPR001863
- PROSITE: PDOC00927
Available protein structures:
- PDB: IPR001863 PF01153 (ECOD; PDBsum)
- AlphaFold: IPR001863; PF01153

Glypicans constitute one of the two major families of heparan sulfate proteoglycans, with the other major family being syndecans. Six glypicans have been identified in mammals, and are referred to as GPC1 through GPC6. In Drosophila two glypicans have been identified, and these are referred to as dally (division abnormally delayed) and dally-like. One glypican has been identified in C. elegans. Glypicans seem to play a vital role in developmental morphogenesis, and have been suggested as regulators for the Wnt and Hedgehog cell signaling pathways. They have additionally been suggested as regulators for fibroblast growth factor and bone morphogenic protein signaling.

== Structure ==
While six glypicans have been identified in mammals, several characteristics remain consistent between these different proteins. First, the core protein of all glypicans is similar in size, approximately ranging between 60 and 70 kDa. Additionally, in terms of amino acid sequence, the location of fourteen cysteine residues is conserved; however, researchers describe glypicans as having moderate similarity in amino acid sequence overall. Nevertheless, it is thought that the fourteen conserved cysteine residues play a vital role in determining three-dimensional shape, thus suggesting the existence of a highly similar three-dimensional structure. Overall, GPC3 and GPC5 have very similar primary structures with 43% sequence similarity. On the other hand, GPC1, GPC2, GPC4, and GPC6 have between 35% and 63% sequence similarity. Thus, GPC3 and GPC5 are often referred to as one subfamily of glypicans, with GPC1, GPC2, GPC4, and GPC6 constituting the other group. Between the subfamilies of glypicans, there is about 25% sequence similarity. Furthermore, the amino acid sequence and structure of each glypican is well-conserved between species; all vertebrate glypicans are more than 90% similar regardless of the species.

For all members of the glypican family, the C-terminus of the protein is attached to the cell membrane covalently via a glycosylphosphatidylinositol (GPI) anchor. To allow for the addition of the GPI anchor, glypicans have a hydrophobic domain at the C-terminus of the protein. Within 50 amino acids of this GPI anchor, the heparan sulfate chains attach to the protein core. Therefore, unlike syndecans the heparan sulfate glycosaminoglycan chains attached to glypicans are located rather close to the cell-membrane. The glypicans found in vertebrates, Drosophila, and C. elegans all have an N-terminal signal sequence.

== Function ==
Glypicans are critically involved in developmental morphogenesis, and have been implicated as regulators in several cell signaling pathways. These include the Wnt and Hedgehog signaling pathways, as well as signaling of fibroblast growth factors and bone morphogenic proteins. The regulating processes performed by glypicans can either stimulate or inhibit specific cellular processes. The mechanisms by which glypicans regulate cellular pathways are not entirely clear. One commonly proposed mechanism suggests that glypicans behave as co-receptors which bind both the ligand and the receptor. Wnt recognizes a heparan sulfate structure on GPC3, which contains IdoA2S and GlcNS6S, and that the 3-O-sulfation in GlcNS6S3S enhances the binding of Wnt to the heparan sulfate glypican. A cysteine-rich domain at the N-lobe of GPC3 has been identified to form a Wnt-binding hydrophobic groove including phenylalanine-41 that interacts with Wnt. Glypicans are expressed in various different amounts depending on the tissue, and they also are expressed to different degrees during the different stages of development. Drosophila Dally mutants have irregular wing, antenna, genitalia, and brain development.

== Location ==
GPC5 and GPC6 are next to one another on chromosome 13q32 (in humans). GPC3 and GPC4 are also found next to one another, and are located on the human chromosome Xq26. Some suggest that this implies that these glypicans arose because of a gene duplication event. The gene for GPC1 is found on chromosome 2q36. Nearby genes include ZIC2, ZIC3, COL4A1/2, and COL4A3/4.

== Simpson-Golabi-Behmel Syndrome ==
Since 1996, it has been known that patients with Simpson–Golabi–Behmel syndrome (SGBS) have mutations in GPC3. Because this is an X-linked syndrome, it appears to affect males more significantly than females. While the phenotype associated with this condition can vary from mild to lethal, common symptoms include macroglossia, cleft palate, syndactyly, polydactyly, cystic and dysplastic kidneys, congenital heart defects, and a distinct facial appearance. Additional symptoms/characteristics have also been noted. Overall, these symptoms/characteristics are distinguished by prenatal and post-natal overgrowth. Typically, patients identified with SGBS have point mutations or microdeletions in the gene encoding GPC3, and the mutations can occur in multiple different locations of the gene. No correlation has been noticed between the location of the GPC3 mutation and the phenotypic manifestation of this disease. therefore, it is inferred that SGBS results due to a nonfunctional GPC3 protein. Researchers currently speculate that GPC3 is a negative regulator of cell proliferation, and this would explain why patients with SGBS experience overgrowth.

== Implications in cancer ==
Abnormal expression of glypicans has been noted in multiple types of cancer, including human hepatocellular carcinoma, ovarian cancer, mesothelioma, pancreatic cancer, glioma, breast cancer and recently GPC2 in neuroblastoma. Most research involving the relationship between glypicans and cancer has focused on GPC1 and GPC3.

A correlation between GPC3 expression levels and various types of cancer. To summarize these findings, it can be generally said that tissues which normally express GPC3 exhibit down-regulation of GPC3 expression during tumor progression. Similarly, the corresponding cancers of tissues which normally do not exhibit GPC3 expression often express GPC3. Furthermore, oftentimes GPC3 expression occurs during embryonic development in these tissues, and is subsequently re-expressed during tumor progression. GPC3 expression can be detected in normal ovarian cells; however, several ovarian cancer cell lines do not express GPC3. On the other hand, GPC3 expression is undetectable in healthy adult liver cells, while GPC3 expression occurs in the majority of human hepatocellular carcinomas. A similar correlation has been found in colorectal tumors. GPC3 is an oncofetal protein in both liver and intestine, as GPC3 is typically only expressed during embryonic development but also found in cancerous tumors.

GPC3 mutations do not occur in the coding sequence of this protein. Ovarian cancer cell lines do not express GPC3 due to hypermethylation of the GPC3 promoter. After removing these methyl groups, the authors restored expression of GPC3. Mesothelioma cell lines contain a GPC3 promoter which is incorrectly methylated. Re-establishing expression of GPC3 prevented colony-forming by cancerous cells.

=== GPC1 implications in cancer ===
In addition to GPC3, GPC1 has also been implicated in tumor progression, especially in pancreatic cancer, glioma, and breast cancer. GPC1 expression is severely high in pancreatic ductal adenocarcinoma cells, and results indicate that GPC1 expression is linked to cancer progression, including tumor growth, angiogenesis and metastasis. In addition to overexpression of GPC1 on the plasma membrane of pancreatic ductal adenocarcinoma cells. GPC1 is released into the tumor microenvironment by these cells. Because glypicans play a role in growth factor binding, researchers have speculated that increased levels of GPC1 in the tumor microenvironment may function to store growth factors for cancerous cells. By reducing the level of GCP1 in pancreatic adenocarcinoma cells, the growth of these cells was hindered. By reducing the levels of expressed GCP1 immunocompromised mice, slowed the growth tumors and reduced angiogenesis and metastases when compared with control GCP1 mice. GPC1 is highly expressed in human glioma blood vessel endothelial cells. Furthermore, increasing the level of GPC1 in mouse brain endothelial cells results in cell growth and stimulates mitosis in response to the angiogenic factor, FGF2. This suggests that GPC1 acts as a regulator for cell cycle progression. GPC1 expression is well-above normal in human breast cancers, while expression of GPC1 is low in healthy breast tissue. Furthermore, expression was not significantly increased for any other glypican. GPC1 plays a role in heparin-binding and cell cycle progression in the breast tissue.

=== GPC2 implications in cancer ===
Glypican-2 (GPC2) is a cell surface heparan sulfate proteoglycan that is important for neuronal cell adhesion and neurite outgrowth. GPC2 protein is highly expressed in about half of neuroblastoma cases and that high GPC2 expression correlates with poor overall survival compared with patients with low GPC2 expression, suggesting GPC2 as a therapeutic target in neuroblastoma. Silencing of GPC2 by CRISPR/Cas9 results in the inhibition of neuroblastoma tumor cell growth. GPC2 silencing inactivates Wnt/β-catenin signaling and reduces the expression of the target gene N-Myc, an oncogenic driver of neuroblastoma tumorigenesis. Immunotoxins and chimeric antigen receptor (CAR) T cells targeting GPC2 have been developed for treating neuroblastoma and other GPC2-positive cancers. Immunotoxin treatment inhibits neuroblastoma growth in mice. CAR T cells targeting GPC2 can eliminate tumors in a metastatic neuroblastoma mouse model. A GPC2-directed antibody-drug conjugate (ADC) is capable of killing GPC2-expressing neuroblastoma cells.

== Molecular biology ==
Glypicans can modify cell signaling pathways and contribute to cellular proliferation and tissue growth. In Drosophila, the glypican dally assists diffusion of the BMP-family growth-promoting morphogen Decapentaplegic in the developing wing, while the developing haltere lacks dally and remains small. Extracellular localization of the other glypican in Drosophila, dally-like, is also required for the proper level of Hedgehog signaling in the developing wing.

== Clinical ==
In humans, glypican-1 is overexpressed in breast and brain cancers (gliomas), while glypican-3 is overexpressed in liver cancers. Glypican-2 is overexpressed in neuroblastoma.

Mutations in this gene have also been associated with biliary atresia.
