= Life Sciences Research Foundation =

Postdoctoral fellowship program

The Life Sciences Research Foundation (LSRF) is a postdoctoral fellowship program, with missions "to identify and fund exceptional young scientists at a critical juncture of their training in all areas of basic life sciences" and "to establish partnerships between those who support research in the life sciences and academic institutions for their mutual benefit".

== Historical background ==
LSRF was established in 1983 by Donald D. Brown of the Carnegie Institution for Science Department of Embryology. As one of four highly competitive postdoctoral awards in the life sciences, each year LSRF receives more than 1000 applications and awards 15-25 fellowships. The Board of Directors also includes Douglas Koshland and Solomon H. Snyder. The 56 sponsors include many top companies in the biotech and pharmaceutical industry.

In 2012, Brown won the Albert Lasker Special Achievement Award in Medical Science, in part for his initiation and 30-year dedication to LSRF.

== Alumni ==
Notable alumni include：

- Philip Beachy of Stanford
- Ben Barres of Stanford
- George M. Church of Harvard
- Gerald F. Joyce of the Scripps Research Institute
- Robert Sapolsky of Stanford.
