= Richard P. Lifton =

American biochemist (born 1953)

11th President of Rockefeller University
- Incumbent
- Assumed office September 1, 2016
- Preceded by: Marc Tessier-Lavigne

Personal details
- Born: 1953 (age 72–73)
- Education: Dartmouth College (BA); Stanford University (MD, PhD)
- Scientific career
- Awards: Wiley Prize in Biomedical Sciences (2008); Breakthrough Prize in Life Sciences (2014)
- Fields: Genetics
- Workplaces: The Rockefeller University; Yale University; Stanford University
- Thesis: The organization and expression of the Drosophila melanogaster histone genes and interspersed mobile elements (1986)
- Doctoral advisor: David Hogness

Richard Priestley Lifton (born 1953) is an American biochemist who has been serving as the 11th and current president of Rockefeller University since September 2016.

== Education and career ==
He earned his B.A. in biological sciences in 1975 from Dartmouth College. He got his M.D. in 1982 and Ph.D. in biochemistry in 1986, both from Stanford University. He trained at Brigham and Women's Hospital before starting his lab at Yale in 1993. He has been awarded the Wiley Prize in Biomedical Sciences for his discovery of genes that are associated with the regulation of blood pressure. In 2014 he was awarded the $3 million Breakthrough Prize in Life Sciences for his work. He has been a Howard Hughes Medical Institute (HHMI) investigator since 1994. He was inducted into the National Academy of Sciences and Institute of Medicine, and he is a Fellow of the American Association for the Advancement of Science.

In May 2016, Lifton was named the president of Rockefeller University. He succeeded Marc Tessier-Lavigne, who left to assume the presidency of Stanford University, Lifton's alma mater.

== See also ==
- Physician-scientist

Academic offices
Preceded by Marc Tessier-Lavigne	11th President of Rockefeller University; 2016 – present	Incumbent
