= Dorothy P. Schafer =

American neuroscientist

Dorothy P. "Dori" Schafer is an assistant professor in the department of neurobiology at University of Massachusetts Medical School. Her research focuses on the role of microglia in the development of synapses and brain circuits as well as the maintenance of synaptic plasticity.

== Early life and education ==
Schafer earned a BA in Neuroscience from Mount Holyoke College in 2001. She completed her PhD in 2008 at the University of Connecticut, where she worked with Matthew Rasband at the University of Connecticut Health Center. From 2008 to 2014, Schafer worked as a postdoctoral fellow in Beth Stevens's lab at Boston Children's Hospital.

In January 2015, Schafer was hired as a tenure-track assistant professor of neurobiology at UMass Medical School. in 2025, Schafer was named as the Molly McGovern Chair in Biomedical Research and associate professor of neurobiology.

== Research ==
=== Microglia-synapse interactions ===
Schafer has studied the phagocytic function of microglia, which is required for synaptic pruning of the connections between the retina and the lateral geniculate nucleus, as well as other highly organized pathways in the healthy central nervous system. The pruning ability of microglia is dependent on complement component 3. Schafer's research includes ablating genes of interest in microglia to determine their effects on synaptic structure as well as behavior.

Microglial cytokine signaling also modulates synaptic function by regulating neurotransmitter receptor expression, which can directly impact neurotransmission. Alongside Beth Stevens, Schafer has proposed an expansion to the tripartite synapse model of neural function called the quad-partite synapse.

=== Neurological disease ===
Microglia are implicated in the development of neuropsychiatric and neurodegenerative diseases such as autism, schizophrenia, ALS, and MS. In a MECP2-null mouse model of Rett syndrome, Schafer demonstrated that microglia contributed to disease by excessively pruning presynaptic inputs, thereby disrupting vulnerable neural circuits. Microglia functioned primarily as "secondary responders" which were excessively activated by disease, a mechanism which may be conserved in other models of neurodegeneration like Alzheimer's disease.

== Awards ==
Schafer has received funding and recognition for her academic work, including the following awards:

- 2019 Freedman prize for exceptional young scientists, Brain and Behavior Research Foundation award,
- 2017-2019 Young Investigator Grant, NARSAD
- 2016-2018 Child Health Research Award, Charles H. Hood Foundation
- 2016-2017 Biomedical Research Award, Worcester Foundation for Biomedical Research
- 2014-2018 K99/R00 Career Transition Award, NIMH
- 2012-2013 Postdoctoral Fellowship Award, Nancy Lurie Marks Family Foundation
- 2010-2011 Bok Center distinction for excellence in teaching, Harvard University
- 2010-2012 NRSA F32 Postdoctoral Fellowship, NINDS
- 2010-2011 Marian Kies Award for outstanding graduate work, American Society for Neurochemistry
- 2007 Lepow Award for outstanding graduate work, University of Connecticut Health Center
