= Glypican 1 =

Protein found in humans

GPC1
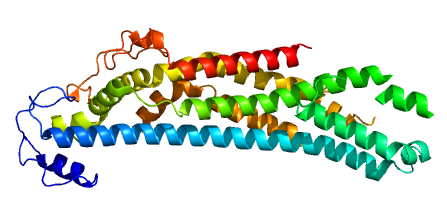

Identifiers
- Aliases: GPC1, glypican, Glypican 1
- External IDs: OMIM: 600395; MGI: 1194891; GeneCards: GPC1
Available structures
PDB	Ortholog search: PDBe RCSB
PDB	List of PDB id codes 4ACR, 4AD7, 4BWE, 4YWT

Gene location (Human)
Chr.	Chromosome 2 (human)
Band	2q37.3	Start	240,435,663 bp
Band	2q37.3	End	240,468,076 bp

Gene location (Mouse)
Chr.	Chromosome 1 (mouse)
Band	1|1 D	Start	92,759,367 bp
Band	1|1 D	End	92,788,501 bp
RNA expression pattern
Bgee	Human / Mouse (ortholog); Top expressed in: ventricular zone; apex of heart; right hemisphere of cerebellum; skin of abdomen; stromal cell of endometrium; right frontal lobe; tibial nerve; skin of leg; left ventricle; periodontal fiber / Top expressed in: calvaria; renal corpuscle; ankle; ventricular zone; muscle of thigh; myocardium of ventricle; temporal muscle; interventricular septum; sternum; triceps brachii muscle; More reference expression data
BioGPS	n/a
Gene ontology
Molecular function	fibroblast growth factor binding; heparan sulfate proteoglycan binding; copper ion binding; laminin binding
Cellular component	endosome; membrane; integral component of plasma membrane; lysosomal lumen; Golgi lumen; membrane raft; anchored component of membrane; extracellular exosome; extracellular space; nucleoplasm; cytosol; plasma membrane; extracellular matrix; extracellular region; intrinsic component of plasma membrane; synapse; anchored component of plasma membrane; collagen-containing extracellular matrix; cell surface
Biological process	glycosaminoglycan metabolic process; myelin assembly; heparan sulfate proteoglycan catabolic process; retinoid metabolic process; axon guidance; negative regulation of fibroblast growth factor receptor signaling pathway; positive regulation of skeletal muscle cell differentiation; glycosaminoglycan catabolic process; glycosaminoglycan biosynthetic process; Schwann cell differentiation; leukocyte migration; regulation of signal transduction; cell migration; regulation of protein localization to membrane
Sources:Amigo / QuickGO
Orthologs
Databases	NCBI: entry; OMA: entry
Species	Human	Mouse
Entrez	2817	14733
Ensembl	ENSG00000063660	ENSMUSG00000034220
UniProt	P35052	Q9QZF2
RefSeq (mRNA)	NM_002081	NM_016696
RefSeq (protein)	NP_002072	NP_057905
Location (UCSC)	Chr 2: 240.44 – 240.47 Mb	Chr 1: 92.76 – 92.79 Mb
PubMed search
- Wikidata
View/Edit Human	View/Edit Mouse

Glypican-1 (GPC1) is a protein that in humans is encoded by the GPC1 gene. GPC1 is encoded by human GPC1 gene located at 2q37.3. GPC1 contains 558 amino acids with three predicted heparan sulfate chains.

== Function ==
Cell surface heparan sulfate proteoglycans are composed of a membrane-associated protein core substituted with three heparan sulfate chains. Members of the glypican-related integral membrane proteoglycan family (GRIPS) contain a core protein anchored to the cytoplasmic membrane via a glycosyl phosphatidylinositol linkage. These proteins may play a role in the control of cell division and growth regulation.

== Interactions ==
Glypican 1 has been shown to interact with SLIT2.

== Clinical significance ==
This protein is involved in the misfolding of normal prion proteins in the cell membrane to the infectious prion form.

In 2015 it was reported that the presence of this protein in exosomes in patients' blood is able to detect early pancreatic cancer with absolute specificity and sensitivity. However this conclusion is disputed. and in more recent overviews of potential markers for pancreatic cancer, Glypican 1 is not mentioned.

Therapeutic antibodies against GPC1 have been developed. GPC1 has been evaluated as a potential target for cancer therapy, including antibody-drug conjugates, CAR-T cell therapy, radiotherapy, bispecific T cell engager and immunotoxins in preclinical studies. HM2 is a mouse monoclonal antibody targeting the C-terminal end of GPC1 developed by the laboratory of Mitchell Ho at the NCI, NIH (Bethesda, US). The Ho lab also produced a dromedary camel V_{H}H nanobody called D4 specific for GPC1.The D4 V_{H}H nanobody-based CAR-T cells and immunotoxins were active against pancreatic cancer in mice. Miltuximab, a chimeric antibody against GPC1, was tested in radioimmunotherapy models of prostate cancer.

== See also ==
- Glypican
