= David Attwell =

British neuroscientist

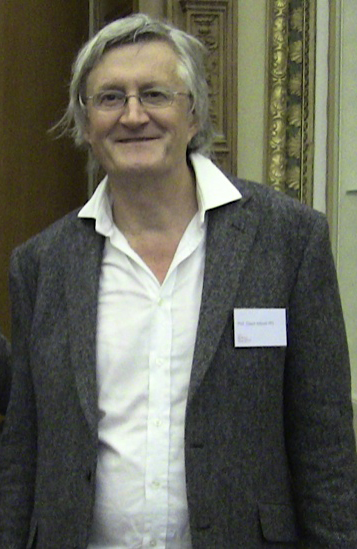
David Attwell at the library of the Royal Society, London, 2012

David Attwell FRS, Fellow of the Academy of Medical Sciences, Member of Academia Europaea, Member of the Norwegian Academy of Science and Letters (born 1953) is a British neuroscientist, and the Jodrell Professor of Physiology at University College London in the Faculty of Life Sciences.

== Life ==
David Attwell studied physics and physiology (with tutorials from John Stein, who facilitated his learning neuroscience) at Magdalen College, Oxford, and earned his D.Phil. in neuroscience from the University of Oxford where he studied with Julian Jack but also worked in the lab of Denis Noble. He did postdoctoral research at the University of California, Berkeley with Frank Werblin.

His notable PhD students include Marc Tessier-Lavigne and Nicola Allen.

He has worked on a wide range of subjects including cardiac electrophysiology, the ion channels in rod and cone photoreceptors and early visual processing, the properties of glial cells (astrocytes, oligodendrocytes and microglia), glutamate transporters, brain energy use and how it constrains the evolutionary "design" of the brain, stroke, Alzheimer's disease, and control of brain blood flow especially at the capillary level by pericytes.

In April 2024, the British Heart Foundation announced that David Attwell had been appointed Director of its new Centre for Vascular Dementia Research.
