= Glypican 5 =

Protein-coding gene in the species Homo sapiens

GPC5

Identifiers
- Aliases: GPC5, glypican 5
- External IDs: OMIM: 602446; MGI: 1194894; GeneCards: GPC5

Gene location (Human)
Chr.	Chromosome 13 (human)
Band	13q31.3	Start	91,398,621 bp
Band	13q31.3	End	92,873,682 bp

Gene location (Mouse)
Chr.	Chromosome 14 (mouse)
Band	14|14 E4	Start	115,329,647 bp
Band	14|14 E4	End	116,762,591 bp
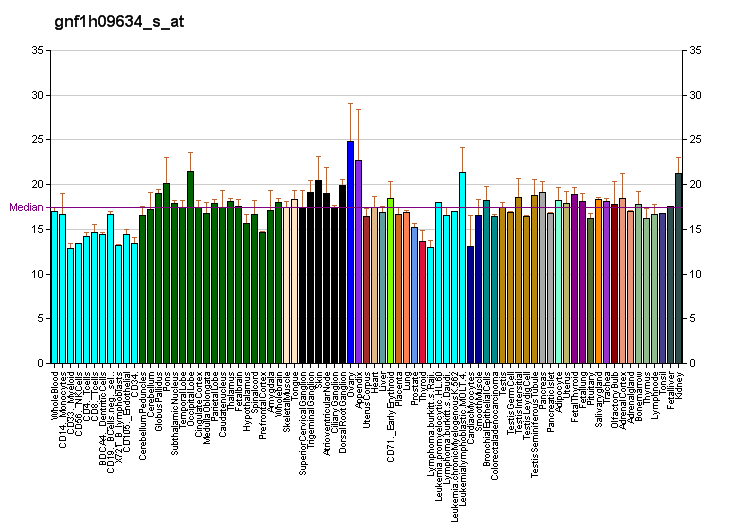
RNA expression pattern
Bgee	Human / Mouse (ortholog); Top expressed in: testicle; caudate nucleus; putamen; endothelial cell; nucleus accumbens; entorhinal cortex; pons; superior vestibular nucleus; amygdala; external globus pallidus / Top expressed in: substantia nigra; globus pallidus; deep cerebellar nuclei; dorsal tegmental nucleus; otolith organ; utricle; paraventricular nucleus of hypothalamus; lateral hypothalamus; inferior colliculi; medial vestibular nucleus; More reference expression data
BioGPS	More reference expression data
Gene ontology
Molecular function	heparan sulfate proteoglycan binding
Cellular component	integral component of plasma membrane; extracellular region; membrane; anchored component of membrane; Golgi lumen; plasma membrane; lysosomal lumen; extracellular space; anchored component of plasma membrane; integral component of membrane; collagen-containing extracellular matrix; cell surface
Biological process	glycosaminoglycan biosynthetic process; retinoid metabolic process; glycosaminoglycan catabolic process; regulation of signal transduction; cell migration; positive regulation of canonical Wnt signaling pathway; regulation of protein localization to membrane
Sources:Amigo / QuickGO
Orthologs
Databases	NCBI: entry; OMA: entry
Species	Human	Mouse
Entrez	2262	103978
Ensembl	ENSG00000179399	ENSMUSG00000022112
UniProt	P78333	Q8CAL5
RefSeq (mRNA)	NM_004466	NM_175500
RefSeq (protein)	NP_004457	NP_780709
Location (UCSC)	Chr 13: 91.4 – 92.87 Mb	Chr 14: 115.33 – 116.76 Mb
PubMed search
- Wikidata
View/Edit Human	View/Edit Mouse

Glypican-5 is a protein that in humans is encoded by the GPC5 gene.

Cell surface heparan sulfate proteoglycans are composed of a membrane-associated protein core substituted with a variable number of heparan sulfate chains. Members of the glypican-related integral membrane proteoglycan family (GRIPS) contain a core protein anchored to the cytoplasmic membrane via a glycosyl phosphatidylinositol linkage. These proteins may play a role in the control of cell division and growth regulation.

== See also ==
- Glypican
