= Dally (gene) =

Dally (division abnormally delayed) is the name of a gene that encodes a HS-modified-protein found in the fruit fly Drosophila melanogaster. The protein has to be processed after being codified, and in its mature form it is composed by 626 amino acids, forming a proteoglycan rich in heparin sulfate which is anchored to the cell surface via covalent linkage to glycophosphatidylinositol (GPI), so we can define it as a glypican. For its normal biosynthesis it requires sugarless (sgl), a gene that encodes an enzyme which plays a critical role in the process of modification of dally.

== Function ==
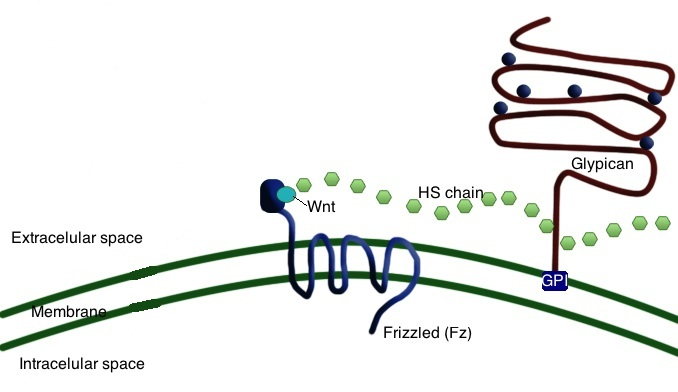
Dally acts as a coreceptor for Frizzled, a receptor of Wnt

Dally works as a co-receptor of some secreted signaling molecules as fibroblast growth factor, vascular endothelial growth factor, hepatocyte growth factor and members of the Wnt signaling pathway, TGF-b and Hedgehog families. It is also necessary for the cell division patterning during the post-embryonic development of the nervous system.

It is a regulatory component of the Wg receptor and is part of a multiprotein complex together with Frizzled (Fz) transmembrane proteins. Therefore, it regulates two cell growth factors in Drosophila melanogaster, Wingless (Wg) and Decapentaplegic (Dpp). It must be said that in vertebrates the equivalent to Dpp are Bone Morphogenetic Proteins, and the mammalian equal to Wg might be integrin-beta 4. The first one (Wg) controls cell proliferation and differentiation during embryos development, specifically in epidermis, whereas the latter (Dpp) plays a role in the imaginal discs' growth.

Dpp and Wg are mutually antagonistic in patterning genitalia. Concretely, dally selectively regulates both Wg signalling in epidermis and Dpp in genitalia. This selectivity is supposed to be controlled by the type of Glycosaminoglycan GAG bonded to the dally protein, considering that there is a huge structural variety in GAGs.

Tissue malformations occur in various situations. As said in the introduction, the sgl enzyme is essential for a normal biosynthesis of dally. That is why the absence or malfunction of this enzyme doesn't allow the correct Wg and Dpp signalling. Also the expression of mutated dally proteins alters Wnt signalling pathways, which leads to anomalies in Drosophila melanogaster's eye, antennal, genital, wing and neural morphogenesis.

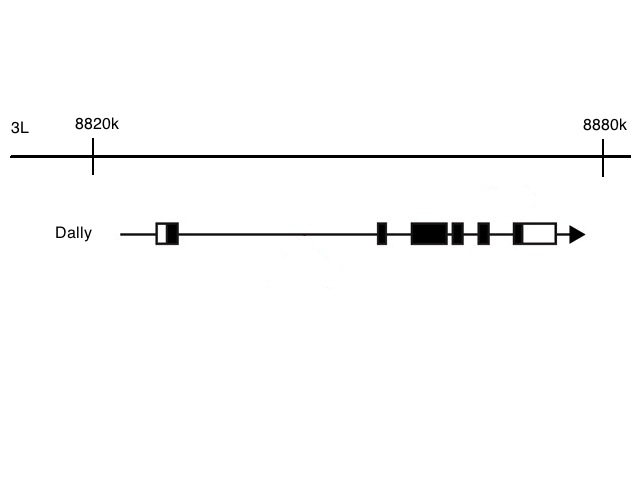
Dally's location in chromosome 3

== Gene location ==
Dally's gene was located in the chromosome 3, concretely in the region 3L 8820605-8884292.

== Mutations and its effects ==
The mutation of Dally is a consequence of the P-element and the place where it is located. It is possible to differentiate between the mutants Dally-P1 and Dally-P2, depending on where the insertion of P-element is. It is known that Dally-P2 generates a bigger amount of defects. This mutated Dally disrupts the cell cycle progression, delaying the process during the G2-mitosis transition. As a matter of fact, mutations affecting Dally disrupt patterning of many tissues, for instance of the nervous system. Dally mutants display cell cycle progression defects in specific sets of dividing cells. Those mutations are pleiotropic and can affect viability and produce morphological defects in several adult tissues, such as the eye, antenna, wing and genitalia.

== Treatment ==
Once the mutation has been codified and the protein is functional, there is no chance to turn back and we will speak about a mutated individual. However, if the mutant dally is codified but it is not performing its function yet, a chaperone can identify it and try to correct the mutation, or directly send it to a proteasome using ubiquitins and degrade it.

Notwithstanding, there is another possible solution when malformations have occurred as a result of Wg activity loss. Ectopic dally can potentiate Wg signaling but this effect is dependent on some Wg activity remaining at the cell surface. Moreover, ectopic expression of dally+ from hs-dally+ transgene, stimulates Wg signaling. Thus, naked larval cuticle loss is recuperated and once the larva has become an adult, its tissues execute their normal function. Despite this fact, an intense expression of dally+ results in the death of most Drosophila melanogaster embryos.
