= Glypican 2 =

Protein-coding gene in the species Homo sapiens

GPC2

Identifiers
- Aliases: GPC2, Glypican 2
- External IDs: OMIM: 618446; MGI: 1919201; GeneCards: GPC2

Gene location (Human)
Chr.	Chromosome 7 (human)
Band	7q22.1	Start	100,169,606 bp
Band	7q22.1	End	100,177,381 bp

Gene location (Mouse)
Chr.	Chromosome 5 (mouse)
Band	5|5 G2	Start	138,271,917 bp
Band	5|5 G2	End	138,278,267 bp
RNA expression pattern
Bgee	Human / Mouse (ortholog); Top expressed in: ganglionic eminence; skin of arm; ventricular zone; sperm; tendon of biceps brachii; pericardium; thymus; buccal mucosa cell; testicle; left testis / Top expressed in: ganglionic eminence; mesencephalon; ventricular zone; neural tube; genital tubercle; spermatocyte; granulocyte; lens; epiblast; tail of embryo; More reference expression data
BioGPS	n/a
Gene ontology
Molecular function	heparan sulfate proteoglycan binding; protein binding
Cellular component	membrane; plasma membrane; extracellular region; lysosomal lumen; endoplasmic reticulum; Golgi lumen; anchored component of membrane; extracellular space; anchored component of plasma membrane; collagen-containing extracellular matrix; cell surface; synapse
Biological process	retinoid metabolic process; glycosaminoglycan catabolic process; glycosaminoglycan biosynthetic process; neuron differentiation; smoothened signaling pathway; regulation of signal transduction; positive regulation of neuron projection development; cell migration; regulation of protein localization to membrane
Sources:Amigo / QuickGO
Orthologs
Databases	NCBI: entry; OMA: entry
Species	Human	Mouse
Entrez	221914	71951
Ensembl	ENSG00000213420	ENSMUSG00000029510
UniProt	Q8N158	Q8BKV1
RefSeq (mRNA)	NM_152742	NM_172412
RefSeq (protein)	NP_689955	NP_766000
Location (UCSC)	Chr 7: 100.17 – 100.18 Mb	Chr 5: 138.27 – 138.28 Mb
PubMed search
- Wikidata
View/Edit Human	View/Edit Mouse

Glypican 2 (GPC2), also known cerebroglycan, is a protein which in humans is encoded by the GPC2 gene. The GPC2 gene is at locus 7q22.1 and encodes for a 579 amino acid protein. The C-terminus of GPC2 has the GPI attachment site, at G554, and the N-terminus encodes a signal peptide, from M1 to S24. Multiple GPC2 mRNA transcripts have been identified. GPC2-201 is the isoform overexpressed in pediatric cancers. Tumor-associated exon 3 of GPC2 shows the lowest expression in normal tissues compared with other exons.

== Function ==
Cerebroglycan is a glycophosphatidylinositol-linked integral membrane heparan sulfate proteoglycan found in the developing nervous system. Cerebroglycan participates in cell adhesion and is thought to regulate the growth and guidance of axons. Cerebroglycan has especially high affinity for laminin-1.

== Implications in cancer ==
GPC2 has been identified as a therapeutic target in neuroblastoma in two independent studies published by Mitchell Ho's lab at the NCI and John Maris's lab at the University of Pennsylvania in 2017. GPC2 is highly expressed in about half of neuroblastoma cases and that high GPC2 expression correlates with poor overall survival. GPC2 silencing inactivates Wnt/β-catenin signaling and reduces the expression of N-Myc, an oncogenic driver of neuroblastoma tumorigenesis. Chimeric antigen receptor (CAR) T cells and Immunotoxins (antibody-cytotoxin fusion proteins) targeting GPC2 inhibit neuroblastoma growth in mouse models. The Ho lab at the National Cancer Institute generated a mouse monoclonal antibody called CT3 targeting human GPC2. The CT3 antibody has been shown to recognize a tumor-associated isoform (isoform 201) of GPC2 with high affinity. Immunohistochemistry using CT3 shows that the antibody has high binding signals on neuroblastoma, medulloblastoma, and retinoblastoma. CT3 does not bind human normal tissues except the testis. CT3-derived CAR T cells regress neuroblastoma in mice. The CT3 mAb is commercially available for Western blot, flow cytometry, immunohistochemistry, and immunofluorescence. A GPC2 specific antibody-drug conjugate (ADC) can inhibit neuroblastoma and small-cell lung cancer cell proliferation and tumor growth in mice.

== See also ==
- Glypican
