= Glypican 4 =

Protein-coding gene in the species Homo sapiens

GPC4

Identifiers
- Aliases: GPC4, K-glypican, glypican 4, KPTS
- External IDs: OMIM: 300168; MGI: 104902; GeneCards: GPC4

Gene location (Human)
Chr.	X chromosome (human)
Band	Xq26.2	Start	133,300,103 bp
Band	Xq26.2	End	133,415,489 bp

Gene location (Mouse)
Chr.	X chromosome (mouse)
Band	X A5|X 28.33 cM	Start	51,141,898 bp
Band	X A5|X 28.33 cM	End	51,254,129 bp
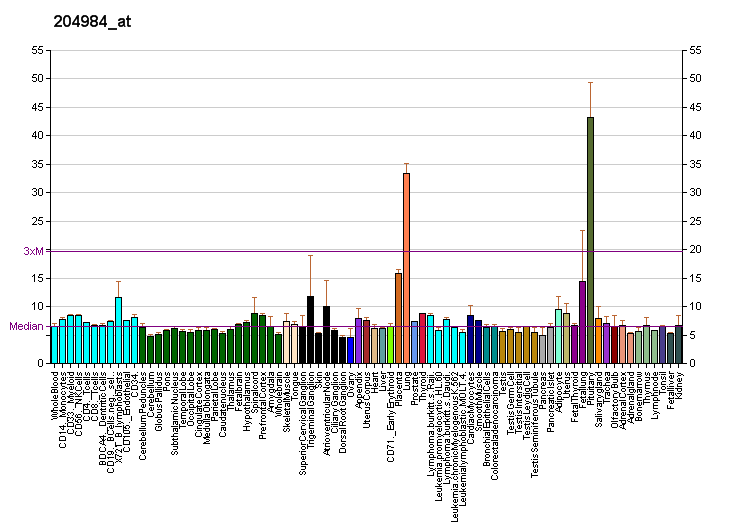

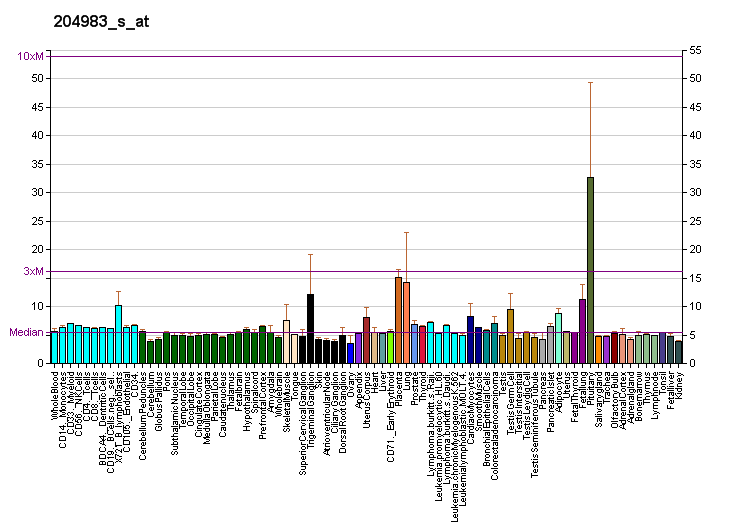
RNA expression pattern
Bgee	Human / Mouse (ortholog); Top expressed in: ventricular zone; ganglionic eminence; gastric mucosa; right lung; thoracic aorta; ascending aorta; popliteal artery; tibial arteries; Descending thoracic aorta; muscle layer of sigmoid colon / Top expressed in: stroma of bone marrow; cumulus cell; ascending aorta; human kidney; right kidney; calvaria; aortic valve; molar; ciliary body; ventricular zone; More reference expression data
BioGPS	More reference expression data
Gene ontology
Molecular function	heparan sulfate proteoglycan binding; coreceptor activity involved in Wnt signaling pathway, planar cell polarity pathway
Cellular component	membrane; plasma membrane; integral component of plasma membrane; extracellular region; lysosomal lumen; Golgi lumen; anchored component of membrane; extracellular exosome; external side of plasma membrane; nucleus; extracellular space; synapse; anchored component of plasma membrane; collagen-containing extracellular matrix; glutamatergic synapse; anchored component of presynaptic membrane; cell surface
Biological process	glycosaminoglycan metabolic process; anatomical structure morphogenesis; retinoid metabolic process; glycosaminoglycan catabolic process; glycosaminoglycan biosynthetic process; cell population proliferation; Wnt signaling pathway, planar cell polarity pathway; regulation of signal transduction; regulation of neurotransmitter receptor localization to postsynaptic specialization membrane; synaptic membrane adhesion; regulation of presynapse assembly; cell migration; regulation of protein localization to membrane
Sources:Amigo / QuickGO
Orthologs
Databases	NCBI: entry; OMA: entry
Species	Human	Mouse
Entrez	2239	14735
Ensembl	ENSG00000076716	ENSMUSG00000031119
UniProt	O75487	P51655
RefSeq (mRNA)	NM_001448	NM_008150
RefSeq (protein)	NP_001439	NP_032176
Location (UCSC)	Chr X: 133.3 – 133.42 Mb	Chr X: 51.14 – 51.25 Mb
PubMed search
- Wikidata
View/Edit Human	View/Edit Mouse

Glypican-4 is a protein that in humans is encoded by the GPC4 gene.

Cell surface heparan sulfate proteoglycans are composed of a membrane-associated protein core substituted with a variable number of heparan sulfate chains. Members of the glypican-related integral membrane proteoglycan family (GRIPS) contain a core protein anchored to the cytoplasmic membrane via a glycosyl phosphatidylinositol linkage. These proteins may play a role in the control of cell division and growth regulation. The GPC4 gene is adjacent to the 3' end of GPC3 and may also play a role in Simpson-Golabi-Behmel syndrome.

== See also ==
- Glypican
