= TMEM50A =

Protein-coding gene in humans

Identifiers
- Aliases: TMEM50A, IFNRC, SMP1, transmembrane protein 50A
- External IDs: OMIM: 605348; MGI: 1919067; GeneCards: TMEM50A

Gene location (Human)
Chr.	Chromosome 1 (human)
Band	1p36.11	Start	25,338,317 bp
Band	1p36.11	End	25,362,361 bp

Gene location (Mouse)
Chr.	Chromosome 4 (mouse)
Band	4 D3|4 67.14 cM	Start	134,625,160 bp
Band	4 D3|4 67.14 cM	End	134,642,335 bp
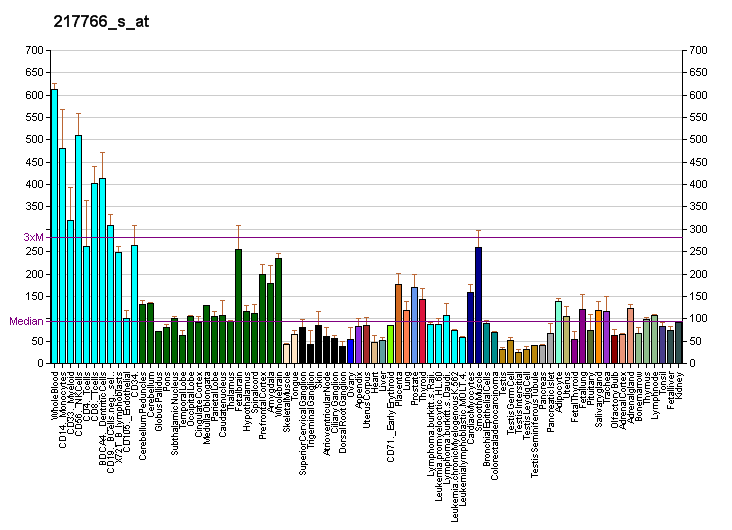
RNA expression pattern
Bgee	Human / Mouse (ortholog); Top expressed in: monocyte; epithelium of nasopharynx; palpebral conjunctiva; pericardium; parotid gland; gums; corpus epididymis; lactiferous duct; mucosa of sigmoid colon; gingival epithelium / Top expressed in: adrenal gland; decidua; granulocyte; calvaria; thymus; stroma of bone marrow; umbilical cord; otolith organ; utricle; blood; More reference expression data
BioGPS	More reference expression data
Orthologs
Databases	NCBI: entry; OMA: entry
Species	Human	Mouse
Entrez	23585	71817
Ensembl	ENSG00000183726	ENSMUSG00000028822
UniProt	O95807	Q9CXL1
RefSeq (mRNA)	NM_014313	NM_027935
RefSeq (protein)	NP_055128	NP_082211
Location (UCSC)	Chr 1: 25.34 – 25.36 Mb	Chr 4: 134.63 – 134.64 Mb
PubMed search
- Wikidata
View/Edit Human	View/Edit Mouse

Transmembrane protein 50A is a protein that in humans is encoded by the TMEM50A gene.

This gene is located in the RH gene locus, between the RHD and RHCE genes. The function of its protein product is unknown; however, its sequence has potential transmembrane domains suggesting that it may be an integral membrane protein. Its position between the RH genes suggests that polymorphisms in this gene may be tightly linked to RH haplotypes and may contribute to selective pressure for or against certain RH haplotypes.

== Gene ==
The TMEM50A gene is located on chromosome 1 p36.11 in the human (homo sapiens) genome. Its mRNA sequence is 2284 base pairs in length and includes seven exons. The coding sequence is from base pairs 151 to 624.

== Protein ==
The TMEM50A protein is 157 amino acids in length.

=== Cellular location ===
PSORT II predicts that TMEM50A is most likely found in the cells plasma membrane or the endoplasmic reticulum.

=== Predicted properties ===
Through bioinformatic analysis several of TMEM50A's protein properties were predicted.

- Molecular Weight: 17.4 KDal
- Isoelectric point: 5.483
- Post-translational modification: Several post-translational modifications are predicted:
  - Two serine phosphorylation sites found at amino acids 82 and 84 Residue
  - One possibleN-Linked Glycosylation Site located at amino acid 74
  - One possible Tyrosine phosphorylation site

=== Structure ===
The exact structure of TMEM50A is unknown but through the use of several prediction programs, some of its most likely structural components can be assumed.

- TMHMM shows that TMEM50A has four transmembrane regions. This was further confirmed by similar results found in TMEM50A orthologs and the neutral charge found in these regions using SAPS program in Biology Workbench
- By using the PELE program in Biology Workbench along with comparing the results of known protein structures, it can be predicted that TMEM50A has:
  - Two Alpha Helix structures
  - Five Beta Sheets

=== Splice sites ===
Alternative Splice sites were found by BLAT on the UCSC genome browser

TMEM50A has several alternative splices including:

- Removal of exon 2
- Removal of exons 2 and 3
- Removal of exons 2, 3, and 5
- Removal of exon 3
- Removal of exon 5

These alternative splice sites don't affect the reading frame of the sequence and thus may not alter the function of the protein.

=== Expression ===
TMEM50A is expressed in almost all human tissues, but evidence from EST profiles through NCBI, suggests that its expression may be slightly higher in parathyroid tissues and brain tissues. It also seems to be expressed higher during the neonate and juvenile development stages.

=== Interacting proteins ===
There is one predicted protein that interacts with TMEM50A, C7orf43. This proteins gene is located on chromosome 7 open reading frame 43. Its function is also unknown.

== Future medical applications ==
Investigation of several GEO profiles showed that TMEM50A is highly upregulated in late stage cervical cancer. This may suggest that TMEM50A has some function that may be causing or is caused directly by cervical cancer. Although few studies are available to confirm this idea, more studies may offer suggestions that use TMEM50A for treatment of late stage cervical cancer.
