= Glypican 6 =

Protein-coding gene in the species Homo sapiens

GPC6

Identifiers
- Aliases: GPC6, OMIMD1, Glypican 6
- External IDs: OMIM: 604404; MGI: 1346322; GeneCards: GPC6

Gene location (Human)
Chr.	Chromosome 13 (human)
Band	13q31.3-q32.1	Start	93,226,807 bp
Band	13q31.3-q32.1	End	94,408,020 bp

Gene location (Mouse)
Chr.	Chromosome 14 (mouse)
Band	14|14 E4	Start	117,162,727 bp
Band	14|14 E4	End	118,213,956 bp
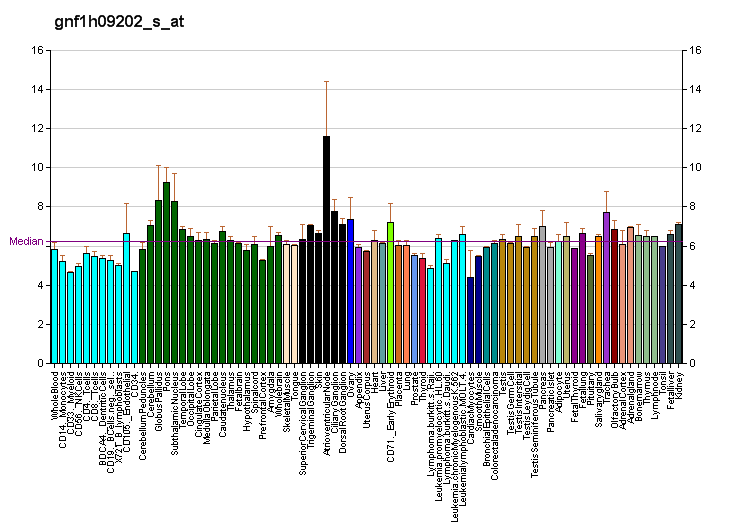

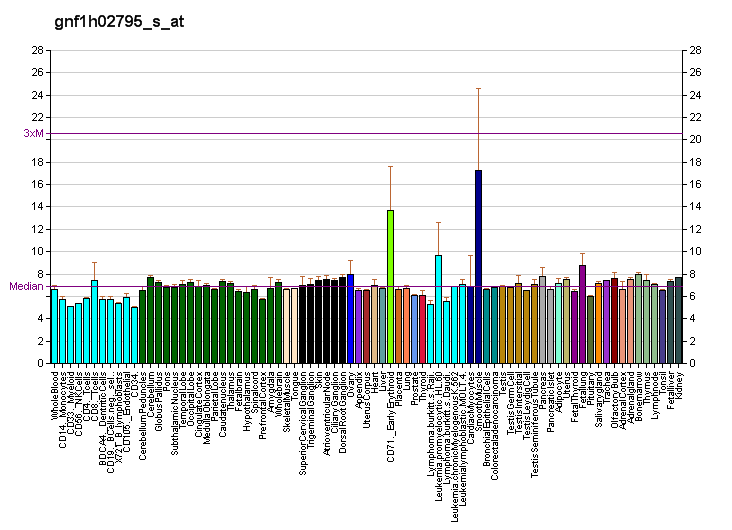

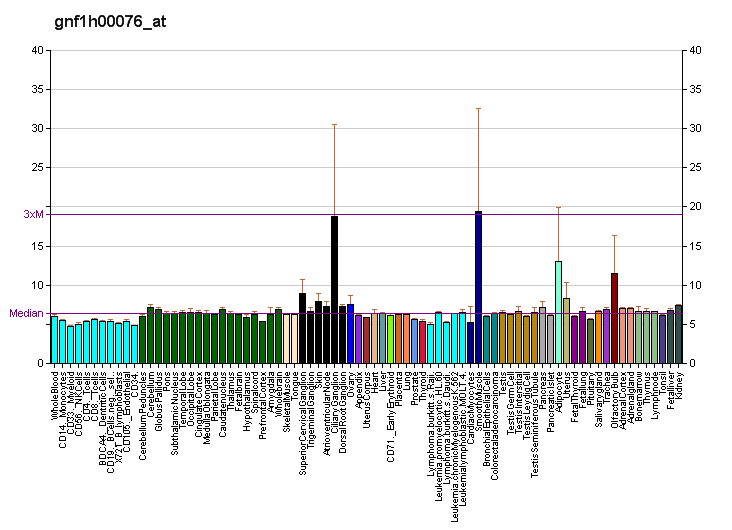
RNA expression pattern
Bgee	Human / Mouse (ortholog); Top expressed in: cartilage tissue; tibia; vena cava; superficial temporal artery; saphenous vein; seminal vesicula; pancreatic epithelial cell; spinal ganglia; synovial membrane; caput epididymis / Top expressed in: ascending aorta; aortic valve; external carotid artery; internal carotid artery; sciatic nerve; genital tubercle; maxillary prominence; mandibular prominence; tail of embryo; human fetus; More reference expression data
BioGPS	More reference expression data
Gene ontology
Molecular function	heparan sulfate proteoglycan binding; coreceptor activity involved in Wnt signaling pathway, planar cell polarity pathway; protein binding
Cellular component	Golgi lumen; nucleus; integral component of plasma membrane; extracellular region; anchored component of membrane; lysosomal lumen; membrane; plasma membrane; extracellular space; anchored component of plasma membrane; collagen-containing extracellular matrix; glutamatergic synapse; cell surface; synapse
Biological process	glycosaminoglycan metabolic process; retinoid metabolic process; cell migration; glycosaminoglycan biosynthetic process; glycosaminoglycan catabolic process; Wnt signaling pathway, planar cell polarity pathway; regulation of signal transduction; regulation of neurotransmitter receptor localization to postsynaptic specialization membrane; regulation of protein localization to membrane
Sources:Amigo / QuickGO
Orthologs
Databases	NCBI: entry; OMA: entry
Species	Human	Mouse
Entrez	10082	23888
Ensembl	ENSG00000183098	ENSMUSG00000058571
UniProt	Q9Y625	Q9R087
RefSeq (mRNA)	NM_005708	NM_001079844; NM_011821
RefSeq (protein)	NP_005699	NP_001073313; NP_035951
Location (UCSC)	Chr 13: 93.23 – 94.41 Mb	Chr 14: 117.16 – 118.21 Mb
PubMed search
- Wikidata
View/Edit Human	View/Edit Mouse

Glypican-6 is a protein that in humans is encoded by the GPC6 gene.

The glypicans comprise a family of glycosylphosphatidylinositol-anchored heparan sulfate proteoglycans. The glypicans have been implicated in the control of cell growth and division. Glypican 6 is a putative cell surface coreceptor for growth factors, extracellular matrix proteins, proteases and anti-proteases.

== See also ==
- Glypican
