= Synaptic pruning =

Process of synapse elimination

A model view of the synapse

Synaptic pruning is the process of synapse elimination or weakening. Though it occurs throughout the lifespan of a mammal, the most active period of synaptic pruning in the development of the nervous system occurs between early childhood and the onset of puberty in many mammals, including humans. Pruning starts near the time of birth and continues into one's late 20s. During elimination of a synapse, the axon withdraws or dies off, and the dendrite decays and dies off. Synaptic pruning was traditionally considered to be complete by the time of sexual maturation, but magnetic resonance imaging studies have discounted this idea.

The infant brain will increase in size by a factor of up to 5 by adulthood. Two factors contribute to this growth: the growth of synaptic connections between neurons and the myelination of nerve fibers. The total number of neurons, however, remains approximately the same, containing approximately 86 (± 8) billion neurons. After adolescence, the volume of the synaptic connections decreases again due to synaptic pruning.

Pruning is influenced by environmental factors. For instance, if the eyes are sewn shut in the critical period when synaptic pruning of the retina takes place, the lack of input of light will cause the synaptic connections required for vision to die off, resulting in blindness.

== Variations ==
=== Regulatory pruning ===
At birth, the neurons in the visual and motor cortices have connections to the superior colliculus, spinal cord, and pons. The neurons in each cortex are selectively pruned, leaving connections that are made with the functionally appropriate processing centers. Therefore, the neurons in the visual cortex prune the synapses with neurons in the spinal cord, and the motor cortex severs connections with the superior colliculus. This variation of pruning is known as large-scaled stereotyped axon pruning. Neurons send long axon branches to appropriate and inappropriate target areas, and the inappropriate connections are eventually pruned away.

Regressive events refine the abundance of connections, seen in neurogenesis, to create a specific and mature circuitry. Apoptosis and pruning are the two main methods of severing the undesired connections. In apoptosis, the neuron is killed and all connections associated with the neuron are also eliminated. In contrast, the neuron does not die in pruning, but requires the retraction of axons from synaptic connections that are not functionally appropriate.

It is believed that the purpose of synaptic pruning is to remove unnecessary neuronal structures from the brain; as the human brain develops, the need to understand more complex structures becomes much more pertinent, and simpler associations formed at childhood are thought to be replaced by complex structures.

Despite the fact it has several connotations with regulation of cognitive childhood development, pruning is thought to be a process of removing neurons which may have become damaged or degraded in order to further improve the "networking" capacity of a particular area of the brain. Furthermore, it has been stipulated that the mechanism not only works in regard to development and reparation, but also as a means of continually maintaining more efficient brain function by removing neurons by their synaptic efficiency.

=== Pruning in the maturing brain ===
The pruning that is associated with learning is known as small-scale axon terminal arbor pruning. Axons extend short axon terminal arbors toward neurons within a target area. Certain terminal arbors are pruned by competition. The selection of the pruned terminal arbors follow the "use it or lose it" principle seen in synaptic plasticity. This means synapses that are frequently used have strong connections while the rarely used synapses are eliminated. Examples seen in vertebrate include pruning of axon terminals in the neuromuscular junction in the peripheral nervous system and the pruning of climbing fiber inputs to the cerebellum in the central nervous system.

In terms of humans, synaptic pruning has been observed through the inference of differences in the estimated numbers of glial cells and neurons between children and adults, which differs greatly in the mediodorsal thalamic nucleus.

In a study conducted in 2007 by Oxford University, researchers compared 8 newborn human brains with those of 8 adults using estimates based upon size and evidence gathered from stereological fractionation. They showed that, on average, estimates of adult neuron populations were 41% lower than those of the newborns in the region they measured, the mediodorsal thalamic nucleus.

However, in terms of glial cells, adults had far larger estimates than those in newborns; 36.3 million on average in adult brains, compared to 10.6 million in the newborn samples. The structure of the brain is thought to change when degeneration and deafferentation occur in postnatal situations, although these phenomena have not been observed in some studies. In the case of development, neurons which are in the process of loss via programmed cell death are unlikely to be re-used, but rather replaced by new neuronal structures or synaptic structures, and have been found to occur alongside the structural change in the sub-cortical gray matter.

Synaptic pruning is classified separately from the regressive events seen during older ages. While developmental pruning is experience dependent, the deteriorating connections that are synonymous with old age are not. The stereotyped pruning can be compared to the process of chiseling and molding of stone into a statue. Once the statue is complete, the weather will begin to erode the statue and this represents the experience-independent deletion of connections.

=== Forgetting problems with learning through pruning ===
All attempts to construct artificial intelligence systems that learn by pruning connections that are disused have the problem that every time they learn something new, they forget everything they learned before. Since biological brains follow the same laws of physics as artificial intelligences, as all physical objects do, these researchers argue that if biological brains learned by pruning they would face the same catastrophic forgetting issues. This is pointed out as an especially severe problem if the learning is supposed to be part of a developmental process since retention of older knowledge is necessary for developmental types of learning, and as such it is argued that synaptic pruning cannot be a mechanism of mental development. It is argued that developmental types of learning must use other mechanisms that do not rely on synaptic pruning.

=== Energy saving for reproduction and discontinuous differences ===
One theory of why many brains are synaptically pruned when a human or other primate grows up is that maintenance of synapses consume nutrients which may be needed elsewhere in the body during growth and sexual maturation. Citing that most of the nutrient costs in the brain are in maintaining the brain cells and their synapses, rather than the firing itself, this theory explains the observation that some brains appear to continue pruning years after sexual maturation as a result of some brains having more robust synapses, allowing them to take years of neglect before the synaptic spines finally disintegrate.

== Mechanisms ==
The three models explaining synaptic pruning are axon degeneration, axon retraction, and axon shedding. In all cases, the synapses are formed by a transient axon terminal, and synapse elimination is caused by the axon pruning. Each model offers a different method in which the axon is removed to delete the synapse. In small-scale axon arbor pruning, patterns of neural activity help determine which synapses are maintained and which are removed, and recent work has linked this activity-dependent pruning to specific signaling pathways involving glial cells and the immune system. Hormones and trophic factors are thought to be the main extrinsic factors regulating large-scale stereotyped axon pruning.

=== Axon degeneration ===
In Drosophila, there are extensive changes made to the nervous system during metamorphosis. Metamorphosis is triggered by ecdysone, and during this period, extensive pruning and reorganization of the neural network occurs. Therefore, it is theorized that pruning in Drosophila is triggered by the activation of ecdysone receptors. Denervation studies at the neuromuscular junction of vertebrates have shown that the axon removal mechanism closely resembles Wallerian degeneration. However, the global and simultaneous pruning seen in Drosophilia differs from the mammalian nervous system pruning, which occurs locally and over multiple stages of development.

=== Axon retraction ===
Axon branches retract in a distal to proximal manner. The axonal contents that are retracted are thought to be recycled to other parts of the axon. The biological mechanism with which axonal pruning occurs still remains unclear for the mammalian central nervous system. However, pruning has been associated with guidance molecules in mice. Guidance molecules serve to control axon pathfinding through repulsion, and also initiate pruning of exuberant synaptic connections. Semaphorin ligands and the receptors neuropilins and plexins are used to induce retraction of the axons to initiate hippocampo-septal and infrapyramidal bundle (IPB) pruning. Stereotyped pruning of the hippocampal projections have been found to be significantly impaired in mice that have a Plexin-A3 defect. Specifically, axons that are connected to a transient target will retract once the Plexin-A3 receptors are activated by class 3 semaphorin ligands. In IPB, the expression of mRNA for Sema3F is present in the hippocampus prenatally, lost postnatally and returns in the stratum oriens. Coincidentally, onset IPB pruning occurs around the same time. In the case of the hippocampal-septal projections, expression of mRNA for Sema3A was followed by the initiation of pruning after 3 days. This suggests that pruning is triggered once the ligand reaches threshold protein levels within a few days after detectable mRNA expression. Pruning of axons along the visual corticospinal tract (CST) is defective in neuropilin-2 mutants and plexin-A3 and plexin-A4 double mutant mice. Sema3F is also expressed in the dorsal spinal cord during the pruning process. There is no motor CST pruning defect observed in these mutants.

Stereotyped pruning has also been observed in the tailoring of overextended axon branches from the retinotopy formation. Ephrin and the ephrin receptors, Eph, have been found to regulate and direct retinal axon branches. Forward signaling between ephrin-A and EphA, along the anterior-posterior axis, has been found to inhibit retinal axon branch formation posterior to a terminal zone. The forward signaling also promotes pruning of the axons that have reached into the terminal zone. However, it remains unclear whether the retraction mechanism seen in IPB pruning is applied in retinal axons.

Reverse signaling between ephrin-B proteins and their Eph receptor tyrosine kinases have been found to initiate the retraction mechanism in the IPB. Ephrin-B3 is observed to transduce tyrosine phosphorylation-dependent reverse signals into hippocampal axons that trigger pruning of excessive IPB fibers. The proposed pathway involves EphB being expressed on the surface of target cells that results in tyrosine phosphorylation of ephrin-B3. Ensuing binding of ephrin-B3 to the cytoplasmic adaptor protein, Grb4, leads to the recruitment and binding of Dock180 and p21 activated kinases (PAK). The binding of Dock180 increases Rac-GTP levels, and PAK mediates the downstream signaling of active Rac that leads to the retraction of the axon and eventual pruning.

=== Axon shedding ===
Time-lapse imaging of retreating axons in neuromuscular junctions of mice have shown axonal shedding as a possible mechanism of pruning. The retreating axon moved in a distal to proximal order and resembled retraction. However, there were many cases in which remnants were shed as the axons were retracting. The remnants, named axosomes, contained the same organelles seen in the bulbs attached to the end of axons and were commonly found around the proximity of the bulbs. This indicates that axosomes are derived from the bulbs. Furthermore, axosomes did not have electron-dense cytoplasms or disrupted mitochondria indicating that they were not formed through Wallerian degeneration.

== Potential role in schizophrenia ==
Synaptic pruning has been suggested to have a role in the pathology of neurodevelopmental disorders such as schizophrenia, as well as in autism spectrum disorder.

Microglia have been implicated in synaptic pruning, as they have roles in both the immune response as macrophages as well as in neuronal upkeep and synaptic plasticity in the CNS during fetal development, early postnatal development, and adolescence, in which they engulf unneeded or redundant synapses via phagocytosis. Microglial synapse engulfment and uptake has been specifically observed to be upregulated in the isolated synaptosomes of male patients with schizophrenia compared to healthy controls, suggesting upregulated microglia-induced synaptic pruning in these individuals. Microglia-mediated synaptic pruning has also been observed to be upregulated during late adolescence and early adulthood, which could also account for the age of onset for schizophrenia often being reported around this time in development (late teens to early 20s for men, and mid-to-late 20s for women) The drug minocycline, a semisynthetic brain-penetrant tetracycline antibiotic, has been found to somewhat reverse these changes made to patient synaptosomes by downregulating synaptic pruning.

Genes in the Complement Component 4 (C4) locus of the major histocompatibility complex (MHC), which encode for complement factors, have also been tied to schizophrenia risk through gene linkage studies. The fact that some of these complement factors are involved in signaling during synaptic pruning also seems to suggest that schizophrenia risk may be linked to synaptic pruning. Specifically, complement factors C1q and C3 have been found to have a role in microglia-mediated synaptic pruning. Carriers of C4 risk variants have also been found to be tied to this kind of synapse overpruning in microglia. Experimental studies in mice have shown that microglia, the resident immune cells of the central nervous system, actively engulf synaptic material during normal postnatal development and are required for the elimination of excess synapses. Disrupting microglial function in these models leads to abnormal numbers of synapses and altered circuit maturation. In autism spectrum disorder, postmortem analyses and animal models suggest that reduced synaptic pruning may contribute to atypical brain connectivity. Children and mice with autism-associated mutations can show increased numbers of dendritic spines, the tiny protrusions that receive most excitatory synapses, along with impaired elimination of these spines during development; these changes have been linked to hyperactivation of the mTOR pathway and defective autophagy in neurons.

== See also ==
- Neuroplasticity
