= Jeremy Gruber =

Jeremy Gruber is a lawyer, writer, and public policy advocate and is the senior vice president at Open Primaries. He regularly testifies before state legislatures on bills to open the primaries. He is the former President and Executive Director of the Council for Responsible Genetics. He has testified before the United States Congress on genetic privacy and discrimination issues. He was a leader of the successful effort to enact the Genetic Information Nondiscrimination Act as well as a number of state laws that preceded it and led the successful campaign to roll back a controversial student genetic testing program at the University of California, Berkeley. In 2011, Gruber led an effort to successfully enact CalGINA-a California law that extends genetic privacy and nondiscrimination protections into areas such as life, long term care, and disability insurance, mortgages, elections and other areas.

Gruber is a founder of the Let Us Vote campaign to build a national community of independent voters and regularly writes and speaks on the second-class status of independent voters. He is author of the reports The Myth of the Red State Policy Over Party in the Nebraska State Capitol and The Next Great Migration: The Rise of Independent Voters in America. He is also an author of the law review article Let All Voters Vote: Independents and the Expansion of Voting Rights in the United States. He is a founder and executive committee member of the Coalition for Genetic Fairness and the Pew Project on the Genetic Information Nondiscrimination Act (GINA). He is an author of the books Genetic Explanations: Sense and Nonsense published by Harvard University Press, Biotechnology in Our Lives published by Skyhorse Publishing, and The GMO Deception by Skyhorse Publishing.

Gruber received his Juris Doctor (J.D.) from St. John's University School of Law School of Law and a B.A. in Politics from Brandeis University. Previously, he worked as the field director for ACLU's National Taskforce on Civil Liberties in the Workplace and then as legal director for the National Workrights Institute.
