= Genetic policy of the United States =

Genetic testing is the analysis of human genes, proteins, and certain metabolites, in order to detect inherited disease-related propensities. These tests can predict the risk of disease in adults, as well as establish prenatal and infant prognoses. The benefits can be substantial, but so can the risks. The possible adverse consequences of genetic tests include discrimination in employment and health insurance and breaches of privacy. Government policies are therefore needed to assure the proper use of genetic tests. The first piece of federal legislation came into effect in 2000.

A second federal law, the Genetic Information Nondiscrimination Act (GINA), has two parts. Title I prohibits genetic discrimination in health insurance. Title II prohibits employment discrimination.

== Federal legislation ==
The first of two pieces of federal legislation to directly address the use of genetic information in the United States was the Executive Order Protecting Federal Employees. Signed into law by U.S. President Bill Clinton on February 8, 2000, the Executive Order prohibited all federal agencies and departments from using genetic information to discriminate in the hiring or promoting of federal employees. The Executive Order was endorsed by the American Medical Association, the American College of Medical Genetics, the National Society of Genetic Counselors, and the Genetic Alliance. The Executive Order also provided explicit genetic privacy regulations within the federal government.

The second piece of federal legislation to address the use of genetic information and discrimination in the United States was the Genetic Information Nondiscrimination Act (GINA) of 2008. GINA protects U.S. citizens from genetic discrimination in employment as well as in health care and health insurance. The bill was signed into law on May 21, 2008, by President George W. Bush. Prior to the introduction of GINA in 2003, several bills of similar intent were introduced: the Genetic Privacy and Nondiscrimination Act of 1995, the Genetic Fairness Act of 1996, the Genetic Information Nondiscrimination in Health Insurance Act of 1995 and the Genetic Confidentiality and Nondiscrimination Act of 1996.

GINA laws do not protect people from genetic discrimination in every circumstance. It does not apply when an employer has fewer than 15 employees. It does not cover people in the U.S. military or those receiving health benefits through the Veterans Health Administration or Indian Health Service. GINA also does not protect against genetic discrimination in forms of insurance other than health insurance, such as life, disability, or long-term care insurance.

== State legislation ==
Currently, legislation pertaining to the use of genetic information and genetic discrimination at the state level varies by state. The first state laws regarding genetic information were typically designed to prohibit genetic discrimination, including prohibiting employers from demanding workers and applicants to provide genetic information as a condition of their employment. More recent laws have permitted individuals to undergo genetic testing when that individual is filing a compensation claim or has requested the test to demonstrate susceptibility to potentially toxic substances.

== See also ==
- Genetic privacy
