= Sharon F. Terry =

American health advocate

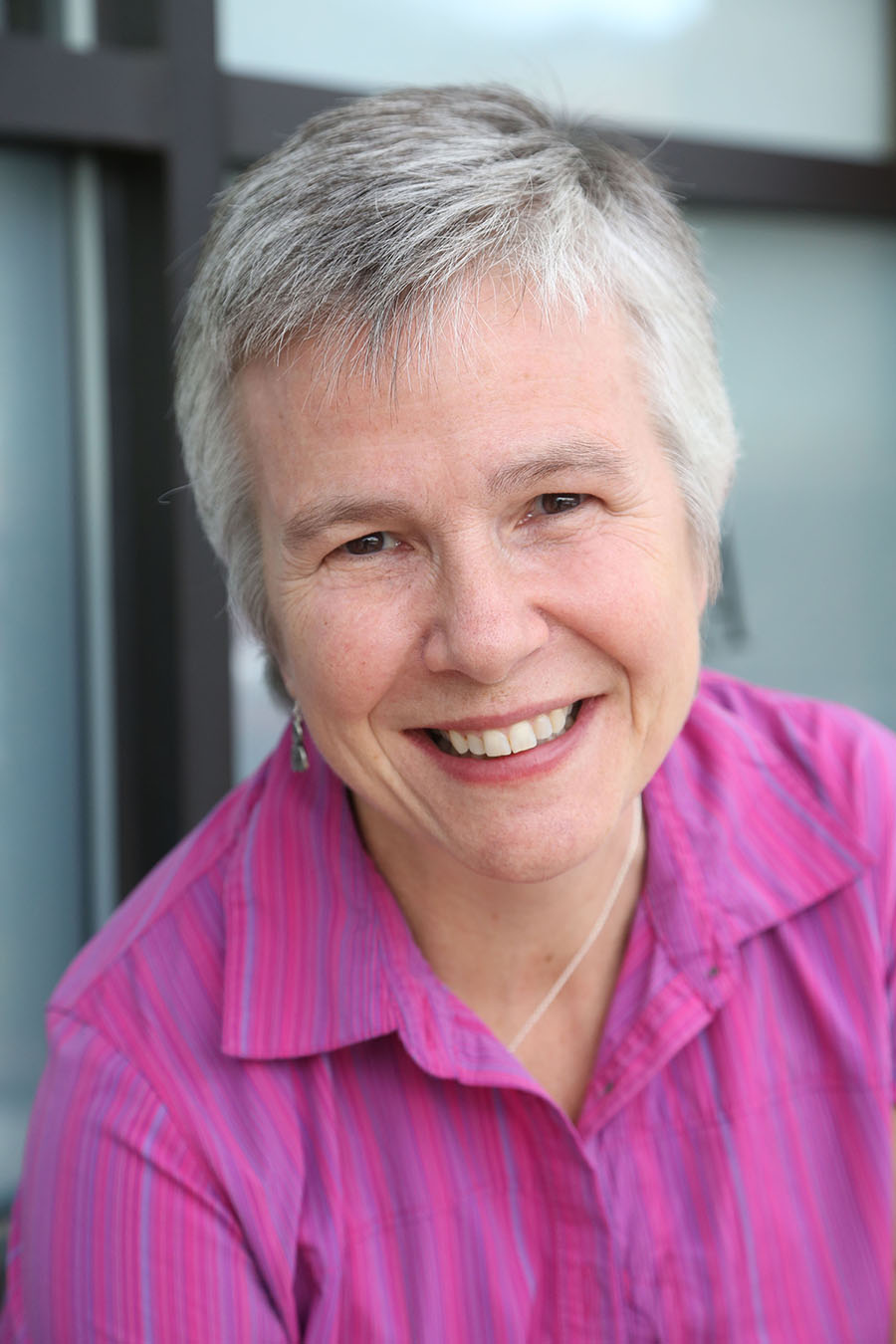
- Born: November 16, 1956 (age 69); Waterbury, Connecticut, U.S.
- Education: State University of New York at Stony Brook, Assumption College
- Occupation: health care advocate
- Spouse(s): Patrick F. Terry, m.1986 d.2019
- Children: 2
- Website: sharonfterry.com

Sharon F. Terry (born November 16, 1956) is an American health advocate in San Diego, California. She co-founded PXE International when her children were diagnosed with pseudoxanthoma elasticum (PXE) in 1994. Her TEDMED talk from 2017 has been viewed more than a million times, and was the subject of the TED Radio Hour. In 2009, she was elected an Ashoka Fellow for her entrepreneurial work in engagement and the development of interventions for genetic conditions.

== Career ==
She is the president and CEO of Genetic Alliance, and Executive Director of PXE International, a research organization for the genetic disorder pseudoxanthoma elasticum (PXE).

She is co-founder of the Genetic Alliance Registry and Biobank. She is the chair of the Coalition for Genetic Fairness that advocated for the passage of the Genetic Information Nondiscrimination Act.

She was on the inaugural Advisory Panel for the Precision Medicine Initiative, is the chair of the National Academy of Medicine Board on Health Sciences Policy and many other health and research related organizations.

In 2005, Terry received an honorary doctorate from Iona College for her work in community engagement and haplotype mapping, and in 2007 received the first Patient Service Award from the UNC Institute for Pharmacogenomics and Individualized Therapy. She also accepted the Paul G. Rogers Distinguished Advocacy Organization Award from Research!America in 2009. In 2012, she received the Spirit of Empowerment Advocacy Award, Facing Our Risk of Cancer Empowered, and was given an honorary professorship, at Hebei United University, Tangshan, China. In 2013, she was named one of the Food and Drug Administration's Rare Disease Heroes. In 2016 she was named a National Association of the National Research Council, and received the Health 2.0 Activist Award. In 2019, she received the Luminary Award from the Precision Medicine World Conference. In 2021, she received the Advocacy Award from the American Society of Human Genetics.

She is president of Schola Ministries, a nonprofit dedicated to producing the music of Kathleen Deignan.

Her work includes novel data-sharing projects such as Registries for All, winner of the Transforming Health Systems Ashoka Changemakers Award. She was on the Institute of Medicine Committee on the Necessity of Use of Chimpanzees in Biomedical and Behavioral Research and the IOM Committee on a Review of the California Institute for Regenerative Medicine. She was the co-chair of the National Academy of Medicine's Roundtable on Genomics and Precision Medicine.
