= Coalition for Genetic Fairness =

- Abbreviation: CGF
- Formation: 1997
- Type: public interest group
- Purpose: Genetic Information Nondiscrimination Act

The Coalition for Genetic Fairness (CGF) is a public interest group concerned about genetic discrimination. The group was founded in 1997 by several organizations. Much of the CGF's work to date has been surrounding the Genetic Information Nondiscrimination Act.

== Members ==
The following is a partial list of CGF's members:

- 20th Century Fox
- American Academy of Family Physicians
- American Association for the Advancement of Science
- American Civil Liberties Union
- American Heart Association
- Association of American Medical Colleges
- Brown University
- Council for Responsible Genetics
- Facing Our Risk of Cancer Empowered (FORCE)
- Genetic Alliance
- Harvard Medical School- Partners HealthCare Center for Genetics and Genomics
- Huntington's Disease Society of America
- Jewish Council for Public Affairs
- Medgar Evers College, CUNY
- Medical College of Wisconsin
- National Association for the Advancement of Colored People (NAACP)
- National Association of Social Workers
- Sarah Lawrence College
- Susan G. Komen for the Cure Advocacy Alliance
- University of Missouri Division of Medical Genetics
- University of North Dakota Division of Medical Genetics
- Yale Cancer Genetic Counseling
- Zeta Phi Beta National Education Foundation
