= Council for Responsible Genetics =

- Abbreviation: CRG
- Formation: 1983
- Founded at: Cambridge, Massachusetts
- Type: non profit
- Purpose: biotechnology

The Council for Responsible Genetics (CRG) was a nonprofit NGO with a focus on biotechnology.

== History ==
The Council for Responsible Genetics was founded in 1983 in Cambridge, Massachusetts.

An early voice concerned about the social and ethical implications of modern genetic technologies, CRG organized a 1985 Congressional Briefing and a 1986 panel of the American Association for the Advancement of Science, both focusing on the potential dangers of genetically engineered biological weapons. Francis Boyle was asked to draft legislation setting limits on the use of genetic engineering, leading to the Biological Weapons Anti-Terrorism Act of 1989.

CRG was the first organization to advance a comprehensive, scientifically based position against human germline engineering. It was also the first to compile documented cases of genetic discrimination, laying the intellectual groundwork for the Genetic Information Nondiscrimination Act of 2008 (GINA).

The organization created both a Genetic Bill of Rights and a Citizen's Guide to Genetically Modified Food. Also notable are CRG's support for the "Safe Seeds Campaign" (for avoiding gene flow from genetically engineered to non-GE seed) and the organization of a US conference on Forensic DNA Databanks and Racial Disparities in the Criminal Justice System. In 2010 CRG led a successful campaign to roll back a controversial student genetic testing program at the University of California, Berkeley. In 2011, CRG led a campaign to successfully enact [CalGINA] in California, which extended genetic privacy and nondiscrimination protections to life, disability and long-term care insurance, mortgages, lending and other areas.

CRG issued six anthologies of commentaries:

- Rights and Liberties in the Biotech Age edited by Sheldon Krimsky and Peter Shorett
- Race and the Genetic Revolution: Science, Myth and Culture
- Genetic Explanations: Sense and Nonsense edited by Krimsky and Jeremy Gruber
- Biotechnology in our Lives edited by Krimsky and Gruber
- The GMO Deception edited by Krimsky and Gruber
- Principles and projects
- Ancestry DNA Testing and Privacy: A Consumer Guide by Krimsky and David Cay Johnson

CRG "fosters public debate about the social, ethical and environmental implications of genetic technologies." They list three central principles:

- The public must have access to clear and understandable information on technological innovations.
- The public must be able to participate in public and private decision making concerning technological developments and their implementation.
- New technologies must meet social needs. Problems rooted in poverty, racism, and other forms of inequality, according to CRG, cannot be remedied by technology alone.

Selected Issues
Cloning and Human Genetic Manipulation
Women and Biotechnology
Genetic Testing, Privacy and Discrimination
Biotechnology and Agriculture
Biowarfare
Genetic determinism

Notable Projects	Description
Genetic Bill of Rights	a set of guidelines to aid in the understanding of CRG's viewpoint on the ethical, legal, social, and environmental implications of biotechnology, meant to foster discussion on the values CRG feels are at risk due to advancing genetic technologies
Race and Genetics	a project including briefing papers and community workshops on various areas where race and genetics intersect, such as racialized medicine, race in science, and racial profiling in DNA databases
Gene Myths	a series of articles disputing what CRG feels are exaggerated and misrepresented ideas about the power of genetic technologies
Forensic DNA	a discussion on the use and regulation of forensic DNA databases with concern for privacy and civil rights

The pioneering contributions of CRG to public interest initiatives concerned with appropriate use of biotechnologies are recounted in the book Biotech Juggernaut: Hope, Hype, and Hidden Agendas of Entrepreneurial Bioscience (Routledge, 2019).

== GeneWatch ==
CRG published GeneWatch, America's first magazine dedicated to monitoring biotechnology's social, ethical and environmental consequences. The publication covered a broad spectrum of issues, from genetically modified food to biological weapons, genetic privacy and discrimination, reproductive technology, and human cloning. Established in 1983, the publication won the Utne Independent Press Award for General Excellence in the category of newsletters in 2006.

== Funding ==
A major source of CRG's funding was the Ford Foundation, which provided $420,000 in grants during 2005–2007.

== See also ==
- Bioethics
- Genomics
