= Uniformization =

Uniformization may refer to:

- Uniformization (set theory), a mathematical concept in set theory
- Uniformization theorem, a mathematical result in complex analysis and differential geometry
- Uniformization (probability theory), a method to find a discrete-time Markov chain analogous to a continuous-time Markov chain
- Uniformizable space, a topological space whose topology is induced by some uniform structure
