= PeaceKeeper Cause-Metics =

PeaceKeeper Cause-Metics is a cosmetics company with a line of products for which all profits, after taxes, are used to support women's health advocacy and human rights issues, while educating the consumer about issues within the human rights field. The company was founded by CEO Jody Weiss in 2002.

Wisdom Says registered the name "PeaceKeeper" as a trademark in February 2001 stating that "the very act of buying a product for which all profits support women's health advocacy & urgent human rights issues would transform the buyer into a PeaceKeeper herself". The company held a "Kiss Campaign" to raise money for women and girls who have left indentured servitude and sex trafficking. Weiss said "The ethos behind the company is to invite women to be proactive, to use their discretionary income to make spending decisions that contribute directly to promoting gender equality and ending violence".
