= Discrimination against people with HIV/AIDS =

People living with HIV/AIDS (PLHIV) face prejudice, fear, rejection, and stigmatization. Marginalized, at-risk groups such as members of the LGBTQ+ community, intravenous drug users, and sex workers are most vulnerable to facing HIV/AIDS discrimination. The consequences of societal stigma against PLHIV are quite severe, as HIV/AIDS discrimination actively hinders access to HIV/AIDS screening and care around the world. Moreover, these negative stigmas become used against members of the LGBTQ+ community in the form of stereotypes held by physicians.

HIV/AIDS discrimination takes many forms such as blood donation restrictions on at-risk populations, compulsory HIV testing without prior consent, violations of confidentiality within healthcare settings, and targeted violence against PLHIV. In addition, HIV discrimination is a global issue that affects individuals despite respective nation laws prohibiting HIV/AIDS discrimination. HIV/AIDS discrimination lowers the chances of PLHIV to seek help, and can affect advancement of treatments.

== HIV-related stigma ==
HIV stigma is a negative opinion or belief towards people with HIV. HIV discrimination is a negative action or behavior towards people with HIV that stem from HIV stigma. HIV/AIDS stigma is divided into the following three categories:

- Instrumental AIDS stigma: A reflection of the fear and apprehension that are likely to be associated with any deadly and transmissible illness.
- Symbolic AIDS stigma: The use of HIV/AIDS to express attitudes toward the social groups or lifestyles perceived to be associated with the disease.
- Courtesy AIDS stigma: Stigmatization of people connected to the issue of HIV/AIDS or HIV-positive people.

PLHIV may also experience internalized stigma. Internalized stigma is when a person applies negative ideas or stereotypes about HIV towards themselves. This can lead to feelings of shame or isolation. Internalized stigma can increase the fear that an HIV diagnosis will be disclosed, and subsequently, increase fear of discrimination or lack of acceptance due to the HIV positive status. UNAIDS, in a study across 25 countries, reports 85% of people experience internalized stigma. HIV-related stigma and discrimination can negatively impact the mental health of people living with HIV.

Stigma towards people living with HIV is widespread. In 35 percent of countries with available data, UNAIDS reports 50 percent of people admitted to having stigma towards people living with HIV. The People Living with HIV Stigma Index (PLHIV Stigma Index) exists as a tool to collect evidence on the prevalence and impact of stigma and discrimination towards people living with HIV. The PLHIV Stigma Index was developed by GNP+, ICW, UNAIDS and IPPF in 2008, and is utilized in over 100 countries. Individual country reports of the PLHIV Stigma Index are available from 2016 and beyond.

=== Domestic stigmatization ===
Domestic stigmatization refers to HIV-related stigma that takes place within the home or familial environment. This form of stigma is distinct from institutional or healthcare stigma because it occurs in private, interpersonal contexts, often involving family members, romantic partners, neighbors, or live-in caregivers. Examples include being isolated within the home, denied access to shared household items, forcibly evicted by relatives, or subjected to verbal or physical abuse due to one’s HIV status.

A 2020 review of 37 studies across multiple countries identified 51 distinct acts of domestic stigmatization reported by PLHIV, with women disproportionately affected. These experiences were linked to microaggressions, emotional distress, and withdrawal from social or medical support systems. The study emphasizes the need for stigma-reducing interventions that target family dynamics and domestic spaces, where support is often assumed but not always present.

People living with HIV face discrimination in many sectors, including healthcare, education, employment, and law enforcement. Discrimination takes the form of denial of services, lack of accessible services for key populations, and insufficient funding and scale for services. In conjunction to internalized stigma, HIV/AIDS stigma and discrimination make it more difficult for PLHIV to feel comfortable in obtaining the medical services they need.

== Misconceptions about HIV in the US ==
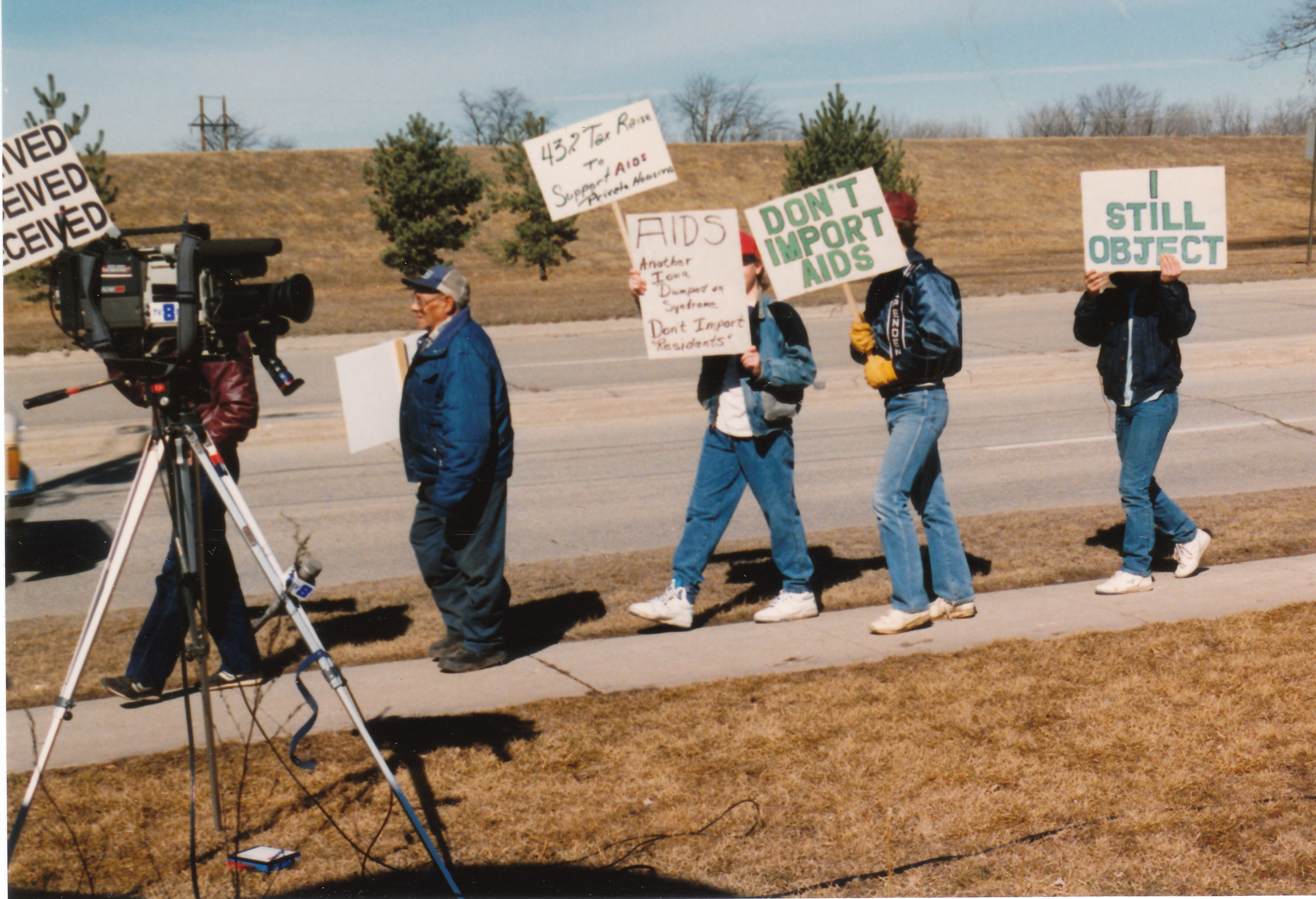
Protest against the opening of an AIDS hospice in Evansdale, Iowa, 3 March 1990

Today, there continues to be significant misconceptions about HIV within the US. Furthermore, misconceptions about the transmission of HIV promotes fear amongst many members of society, and this often translates into biased and discriminatory actions against PLHIV.

A 2009 study conducted by the Kaiser Family Foundation found that many Americans still lack basic knowledge about HIV. According to the survey, a third of Americans believe that HIV could be transmitted through sharing a drink or touching a toilet used by an HIV-positive individual. Furthermore, the study reported that 42 percent of Americans would be uncomfortable with having an HIV-positive roommate, 23 percent would be uncomfortable with an HIV-positive coworker, 50 percent would be uncomfortable with an HIV-positive person preparing their food, and 35 percent would be uncomfortable with their child having an HIV-positive teacher. Many of the respondents who were able to correctly answer questions about HIV transmission still reported similar biased views against HIV-positive individuals; in fact, 85 percent of these respondents reported that they would feel uncomfortable working with an HIV-positive coworker.

Some of the misconceptions about HIV within the US could result from a failure to prevent misinformation from spreading and a lack of accurate information being published. "The lack of adequate resources devoted to AIDS in the early days of the epidemic curtailed surveillance efforts and epidemiological studies at the C.D.C. and markedly hampered the biomedical research community's ability to respond."

=== Misconceptions about transmission of HIV ===
The only way that HIV can be transmitted from one individual to the next is by sharing of certain bodily fluids such as semen, blood, and vaginal discharge which the virus uses as a medium to enter the bloodstream of the recipient; HIV is not transmissible via fluids such as saliva, sweat, tears, or urine as it is not in high enough concentrations to spread in these matters. In order for HIV to enter another person, either the semen, blood, or vaginal discharge must find an entry point by way of injection, unprotected sex, or during pregnancy as the mother can pass it along; one would only contract the virus when coming in direct contact with these fluids, for example, with an open cut on the skin that exposes blood.

PLHIV who are taking ART as prescribed have a sustained undetectable viral load are unable to sexually transmit HIV to others(U=U or Undetectable equals Untransmittable); An undetectable viral load is achieved through taking medication which lowers the amount of HIV present in the bloodstream to undetectable levels,resulting in an undetectable viral load. Pre-exposure prophylaxis (PrEP), by contrast, is a medication used regularly to prevent HIV infection in individuals with an increased risk of acquiring the virus.

People do not contract AIDS, rather, they contract HIV, which can progress into AIDS if left untreated; However, an HIV diagnosis, does not mean that a person will inevitably develop AIDS. Treatment with antiretroviral therapy (ART) can suppress the virus, lower the viral load, and prevent the progessions of HIV to AIDS.

=== Misconceptions about at-risk populations ===
Tim McCaskell, a Canadian writer and HIV/AIDS advocate, explains that AIDS was seen as a political problem against marginalized people. AIDS Action Now explored how medical professionals were mistreating PLHIV patients. Furthermore, he also found out that there was a lack of funds for research or education. Doctors were not fulfilling their roles as fiduciaries for marginalized people while the public believed that the doctor-patient relationship meant remaining as neutral as possible.

Many people incorrectly believe that HIV is exclusive to gay men who have sex, but, although the risks are higher for gay and bisexual males, anyone is susceptible to contracting the virus regardless of their sexual orientation, race, age, and so forth. Some forms of violence such as childhood trauma, rape, and sexual assault can lead people to engage in unsafe sexual practices that could increase their chances of contracting HIV. For example, in some cases, young girls and women who experience these traumatic events become sex workers or engage in prostitution which further increases their risk of contracting HIV.

These discriminatory views of PLHIV also persist within the medical field. A 2006 study of health professionals in Los Angeles County found that 56 percent of nursing facilities, 47 percent of obstetricians, and 26 percent of plastic surgeons had unlawfully refused to treat an HIV-positive patient, citing concerns of HIV transmission. Overall, this societal stigma and discrimination has exacerbated distrust towards healthcare workers within the HIV-positive population. The health care community therefore has an ethical duty to dispel stereotypes and misconceptions about HIV.

== Discriminatory practices in healthcare settings ==
Discriminatory practices within the medical field have been found to greatly impact the health outcomes of PLHIV. In both low-income and high-income nations, there have been several reported cases of medical providers administering low-quality care or denying care altogether to patients with HIV. In a 2013 study conducted in Thailand, 40.9 percent of health workers reported worrying about touching the clothing and personal belongings of patients with HIV, despite possessing the knowledge that HIV does not spread through such items. In a 2008 study of 90 countries, one in four PLHIV reported experiencing some form of discrimination in healthcare settings. Furthermore, one in five individuals with HIV reported having been denied medical care. Even more concerning is the impact HIV-related discrimination has had on HIV-positive women. According to the 2008 study, one in three women living with HIV have reported instances of discrimination related to their sexual and reproductive health within a healthcare setting. In another study of 23 countries, in every country women have reported reproductive coercion. In addition, intersectionality affects the stigma and discrimination against these women. Furthermore, it has been reported that many health care workers in Europe and Central Asia lack knowledge about how HIV is transmitted, leading to them avoiding physical contact with PLHIV and feeling reserved about providing care to populations with a high HIV-prevalence.

Another common form of discrimination within healthcare settings is the disclosure of a patient's HIV status without the patient's explicit permission. Within many countries, an HIV-positive status can result in social exclusion, loss of social support, and decreased chances of getting married. Therefore, concerns about potential breaches of confidentiality by health workers pose significant barriers to care for HIV-positive individuals. In a comprehensive study of 31 countries, one in five persons living with HIV reported instances of a health provider disclosing their HIV-positive status without consent. Additionally disclosure of a person's HIV status within a healthcare setting is not exclusive to patients but also poses an ethical problem for HIV positive healthcare professionals. Due to a lack of proficient knowledge and understanding of how HIV spreads from person to person some patients feel uncomfortable being treated by a PLHIV and claim they have a "right to know" if their healthcare providers have a positive diagnosis which raises ethical questions on staffs right to privacy versus the patients right for standard of care.

These discriminatory practices within the medical field have resulted in the delayed initiation of HIV treatment among HIV-positive individuals. In New York City, men who have sex with men, transgender women, and persons of color living with HIV have all reported that stigma and discrimination among medical providers was a major deterrent from entering or staying in HIV care. A 2011 community-based study found that the most widely reported barrier to care amongst HIV-positive individuals is fear of stigma within healthcare settings. HIV-positive individuals who have experienced significant HIV-related stigma are 2.4 times less likely to present for HIV care. Currently, as many as 20–40 percent of Americans who are HIV-positive do not begin a care regimen within the first six months of diagnosis. Overall, this perpetuation of HIV discrimination has been detrimental to the health outcomes of HIV-positive individuals, as patients who begin treatment late in the progression of HIV have a 1.94 times greater risk of mortality in comparison to those who start treatment at the onset of diagnosis, suggesting that HIV treatment delays stemming from fears of discrimination may have fatal consequences.

=== Blood donation restrictions on at-risk populations ===
Between 1970 and 1980, more than 20,000 HIV infections were attributed to contaminated blood transfusions. The lack of sensitive blood screening methods for HIV detection prompted the enactment of lifetime bans on blood donations from men who have sex with men (MSM), sex workers, and intravenous drug users, as these population groups were viewed to be at high risk of contracting HIV. At the time, this policy was viewed by health professionals as an emergency measure to prevent the contamination of the general blood supply. Multilateral institutions such as the World Health Organization (WHO) actively promoted the enactment of lifetime bans in efforts to mitigate transfusion-related HIV infections. This ban was adopted by the US, as well as several European countries in the 1980s.

The blood donation ban on MSM and transgender women, in particular, has provoked substantial criticism. Members of the LGBTQ+ community view these laws as discriminatory and homophobic. A significant criticism of the blood donation restrictions is that healthcare workers treat the LGBTQ+ community as a homogenous population that engages in similar sexual practices and behaviors. However, like any other population, MSM vary greatly in the number of sexual partners they have and in their engagement in high-risk sexual behaviors. Overall, the donation ban on MSM and transgender women has further exacerbated growing distrust of the medical system within the LGBTQ+ community, especially given the history of homophobia within the medical profession. As a result of these policies, LGBTQ+ individuals have felt substantial pressure to conceal their sexual orientation from medical providers and healthcare personnel.

Blood banks today utilize advanced serological testing technologies with close to 100% sensitivity and specificity. Currently, the risk of HIV-contaminated blood infection is 1 per 8-to-12 million donations, thus demonstrating the effectiveness of modern HIV screening technologies. Despite these significant laboratory advances, the lifetime blood donation ban on MSM remains in several Western countries. Today, medical organizations such as the American Red Cross and World Health Organization are highly critical of these lifetime bans on men who have sex with men, as the epidemiology of HIV has changed drastically in the last 40 years. In 2015, a mere 27% of novel HIV infections originated from the MSM population. In response to this epidemiological data, public health experts, medical personnel, and blood-banking organizations have called upon country governments to reform these outdated MSM blood donation policies.

Mounting public pressure has prompted countries such as the US and UK to reform their MSM blood donation restrictions. In 2015, the US substituted its lifetime ban for a 12-month deferral since last MSM sexual contact, although indefinite lifetime bans remain in place for sex workers and IV drug users. Despite these small steps in the right direction, the American Red Cross has recommended that the Food and Drug Administration (FDA) further revise its policy by adopting a three-month deferral period for MSM, as this is the current standard in countries such as Canada and the UK. Overall, it is estimated that completely lifting the MSM blood donation ban could increase the total blood supply in the US by 2–4%, which could help save millions of lives. Given the blood supply shortage during the COVID-19 pandemic, blood donation restrictions have recently become the subject of further criticism.

On 2 April 2020, the FDA provided updated guidance regarding blood donation in response to the blood shortage caused by the COVID-19 pandemic. This change came following pressure from Democratic senators and LGBTQ+ rights organizations such as the Human Rights Campaign and GLAAD to reduce the 12-month deferral period for MSM and women who have sex with MSM. The updated guidance released by the FDA reduced the deferral period to three months, but did not meet activists' demands to base blood donation eligibility on individualized situations rather than "inaccurate stereotypes". On 8 June 2020, the American Red Cross implemented these changes made by the FDA and reaffirmed in their announcement of these changes their belief that sexual orientation should not affect blood donation eligibility. These changes catalyzed increased advocacy to end the ban against blood donations from MSM and transgender women entirely. The National LGBT Bar Association launched a "End the Gay Blood Ban" Campaign which called on the FDA to replace the current policy that singles-out MSM and transgender women with an individualized risk-based assessment, a policy currently used in countries such as Italy and Argentina. This policy would assess a potential donor's personal risk factors rather than their sexual orientation. On 16 April 2020, GLAAD issued an open-letter to the FDA from over 500 infectious disease and HIV specialists, public health professionals, clinicians, healthcare administrators, trainees and researchers calling for a reevaluation of the updated guidance and the elimination of the blood ban in its entirety.

== Violence against PLHIV ==
Discrimination that is violent or threatening violence stops a lot of individuals from getting tested for HIV. Violence is an important factor against the treatment of PLHIV. When PLHIV, particularly women, develop an intimate relationship, they tend not to be able to disclose to their partners of the presence of HIV in their system for fear of violence against them; this fear prevents them from receiving financial support to seek out testing, treatment, and general support from medical professionals and family members. A study done on PLHIV in South Africa shows that out of a study population of 500, 16.1% of participants reported being physically assaulted, with 57.7% of those resulting from one's intimate partners such as husbands and wives. The available data show high rates of participants socially isolating themselves from both friends and family, in addition to avoiding the seeking of treatment at hospitals or clinics due to increasing internalized fears.

HIV criminalization is when people living with HIV are incarcerated for non malicious HIV transmission. The intention behind HIV criminalization was to protect public health from HIV transmission, but it proved to be discriminatory towards people living with HIV. Furthermore, in the legal system, people living with HIV face discrimination and stigma; with intersectionality determining the severity of the discrimination. In some countries, HIV discrimination and criminalization is disproportional towards migrant heterosexual men. In the US and Canada, men of color are disproportionally the victims of HIV discrimination and criminalization. Thus, HIV criminalization is used as an extension of other types of stigma and discrimination toward marginalized groups.

== Psychological impact of HIV discrimination ==
PLHIV have a higher chance of developing self-deprecating attitudes and coping skills to deal with the social repercussions of an HIV-positive diagnosis. A common concern of PLHIV is the belief that they will automatically develop AIDS and not be able to live a long, productive life as others around them. While there is no cure for HIV/AIDS, ART and other medication prevent the virus from worsening and spreading which allows for PLHIV to live longer and still establish a life or family with people. Unfortunately, association with their condition and early death increases chances of developing a depressive state in PLHIV who may not have access to these resources. Other related psychological impacts in PLHIV are side effects from taking ART, antiretroviral therapy.

Negative social consequences such as stigmatization and discrimination have severe psychological implications on PLHIV: when a person chooses to disclose their status, it can lead to restricted options for marriage and even employment, which tends to worsen the mental health of these individuals and often results in a future fear of disclosure. A meta-analysis conducted in 2021 found a strong positive correlation between HIV status and suicide rates compared to the general population, with PLHIV having 100 times higher risk of committing suicide than the general global population. Further analysis cited "[b]iological, psychological, social, and structural determinants" as factors for the increase.

Research done in South Africa has found that the high levels of stigma experienced by HIV-positive individuals has a severe psychological impact. Internalized stigma and discrimination is severe throughout the PLHIV community, as many PLHIV in South Africa blamed themselves for their current situation. Psychological support for PLHIV in certain countries around the world is scarce.

A study examining the impact of discrimination on PLHIV concluded that experiencing higher levels of HIV discrimination is correlated with a depressive state and even receiving psychiatric care the previous year. Depressive symptoms have also been correlated with elevated rates of suicidal ideation, anxiety and disease progression. Another recent study that predominantly focused on HIV-positive African American men concluded that discrimination has a profound impact on reducing the quality of life of these individuals.

Studies have also shown that PLHIV living in non-metropolitan areas of the US also experience large amounts of emotional distress. 60 percent of participants enrolled in a randomized clinical trial reported moderate or severe levels of depressive symptomatology on the Beck Depression Inventory. This is due to these participants receiving much less social support, and also due to great levels of HIV-related stigma and rejection within families. Furthermore, relative to their urban counterparts, PLHIV in non-metropolitan areas experience more loneliness, a lack of sufficient healthcare and social services, and higher levels of discrimination which contribute to greater levels of emotional distress.

== HIV/AIDS health disparities in marginalized groups ==
The US HIV epidemic has drastically evolved over the course of the last 40 years since the AIDS epidemic that started in 1981, and this disease has been rampantly widespread in socially marginalized and underrepresented communities. Statistics show that most HIV infections occur in sexual minorities and communities of color, specifically Black and Hispanics/Latinos. For example, in 2021, African Americans accounted for 40% of all new HIV infections while making up only 12% of the US population. Similarly, 78% of HIV infections in Georgia occur among African Americans, while African Americans comprise only 30% of the overall population. Hall et al. (2008) found distinct incidence rates of HIV infection among African Americans (83/100,000 population) and Latinos (29/100,000), specifically when compared to whites (11/100,000).

The single group that is consistently at the greatest risk for HIV infection happens to form the intersection of sexual orientation and racial background; MSM are the most HIV affected Americans, and African American MSM are at an HIV risk that is six times greater than that of white MSM. Notably, in England, racial disparities in HIV-related healthcare continue to be a pressing issue. A 2025 report by the National AIDS Trust found that 19% of Black people living with HIV in London avoided visiting their general practitioner due to fears of discrimination, while 20% reported receiving judgmental comments from healthcare staff. These findings highlight the need for greater cultural competency among medical professionals and targeted policy interventions to address institutional racism within the UK's National Health Service. Studies suggest that people experiencing intersectional stigma face greater barriers in accessing healthcare, employment, and social support systems, further marginalizing affected individuals. Aside from race and sexual orientation, socioeconomic status, education and employment are all equally important factors that studies link to HIV infection. The CDC reports that HIV rates are highest among groups who are at or below the poverty level; they also found that individuals who are unemployed and/or have less than a high school education are more prone to HIV infection.

In order to help HIV infected people receive care, the first vital step revolves around HIV testing and early diagnosis. Delayed testing is highly detrimental and leads to an increased risk of HIV transmission. Currently, there are many issues associated with HIV diagnosis and lack of available testing for minorities. A study of 16 US cities found that African Americans are more likely to be tested much later for HIV infection, which places this group at a stark disadvantage for gaining access to proper treatment. This is problematic because a prolonged HIV infection can quickly become an AIDS diagnosis, and this can be prevented with early and frequent testing. Approximately 35–45% of those diagnosed with HIV are believed to also have AIDS at the time of testing. About half of the people diagnosed with HIV do not receive care in any given year, which poses a risk that they are endangering others and themselves while they are not given treatment.

Along with race, a person's socioeconomic status prevents people from getting testing for HIV. With those who are from a lower socioeconomic status and have HIV, mortality is much higher for this population compared to those from a higher socioeconomic status. There are partly two barriers when it comes to income level: health insurance coverage and housing stability. With insurance coverage, those uninsured or with governmental health insurance, such as Medicaid or Medicare through the Affordable Care Act (ACA), have minimal options for testing and treatment, more specifically, ART and PrEP, respectively. An economic study found that nearly 115,000 people living with HIV are uninsured, but then of those 115,000 people, 60,000 live in states that are not expanding coverage to people who can be eligible for Medicaid. Various studies suggest that groups with lower socioeconomic status and lower education level are associated with poorer medication adherence. These individuals have also been found to be more likely to die after initiating treatment.

Stable housing status can be a considerable stressor for low-income people. This stressor leads to many low-income individuals, especially those who are homeless or those not able to have stable housing, not focusing on getting the medical support and treatment needed for those living with HIV and those at risk. One cohort study from interviews in Manhattan found that those who are stably housed are more likely to see their doctor daily for HIV treatment rather than those who are marginally housed or homeless. This is partly due to priorities being different for those in high and low-income communities, with health coming in last and being financially stable coming in first for low-income individuals. Moreover, those experiencing homelessness are at a higher risk of exposure to HIV due to there being a correlation between being homeless and getting into drug use (i.e., sharing needles) and increased risk of partaking in sex work. This pre-exposure to different health behavioral risks makes testing and treatment for HIV challenging to get to those experiencing homelessness in time.

Transgender women are another population often disregarded in the HIV/AIDS discussion. Some clinics either lack the knowledge or refuse to offer gender-affirming hormone therapy alongside HIV treatment, forcing transgender women to choose between vital aspects of their healthcare. A study of transgender women living with HIV in seven urban areas across the US found that employment discrimination was strongly linked to decreased healthcare utilization, including fewer primary care visits and lower adherence to HIV treatment. Programs that fail to address the specific needs of transgender women often categorize them as cisgender men, resulting in a lack of culturally competent care. Culturally competent care involves delivering healthcare services that acknowledge and respect the diverse cultural backgrounds, values, and needs of patients. In the context of HIV/AIDS, this approach is vital for addressing health disparities among marginalized groups. For instance, a 2024 study by the Kirby Institute reported a 21.5% increase in HIV notifications among individuals from culturally and linguistically diverse (CALD) backgrounds in Australia over the past decade.

=== Access to PrEP among marginalized groups ===
Marginalized groups also face barriers to accessing HIV/AIDS preventative care such as PrEP. Studies have shown that concerns about paying for PrEP and talking to healthcare providers about sexual behaviors have contributed to low PrEP use among young sexual minority men. Other structural barriers to PrEP use include limited knowledge of its availability, stigma surrounding HIV, and distrust of the medical establishment among minority groups due to years of discrimination within the medical field against marginalized groups. A poll conducted on the gay dating-app Grindr found a high prevalence of poor access to health insurance and lack of education about PrEP among respondents. Among transgender women, studies have found that cost concerns, mental health, substance use issues, concerns about hormone interaction, uncomfortable side effects, difficulty taking pills, stigma, exclusion of transgender women in advertising, and lack of research on transgender women and PrEP are all barriers to PrEP. In addition, structural barriers to PrEP use among transgender women include employment, transportation, and housing insecurity/homelessness. A study of Black MSM in London found that instances of racism in spaces dedicated to gay men led to an avoidance of these spaces among the study participants, leading Black MSM to miss out on PrEP awareness that was disseminated via gay channels.

=== HIV/AIDS disparities among the incarcerated population ===
As of the end of 2018, the black imprisonment rate was about twice that of Hispanics and more than five times the imprisonment rate amongst whites in the United States. Moreover, black males are more likely to be imprisoned with 2,272 inmates per 100,000 black men, in comparison to 1,018 inmates per 100,000 Hispanic men and 392 inmates per 100,000 white men. Incarcerated individuals have a much higher risk of having HIV than non-incarcerated individuals. The estimated global HIV prevalence for prisoners is 3%, whereas the estimated global HIV prevalence for adults in general is 0.7%. Additionally, women in prison have a higher HIV prevalence than men. Incarcerated individuals also have a high risk of transmission as well due to high-risk activity (i.e. unsafe and unsterile tattooing, needle sharing, and unprotected sexual activity). Needle sharing is much more prevalent in prisons because possession of needles in prison is oftentimes a criminal offense, causing clean needles to be scarce. Only about 30% of countries worldwide offer condoms for incarcerated individuals, but for the countries that do offer condoms, coverage and access is not reported. Moreover, these individuals have a harder time accessing critical HIV resources such as ART. Even if ART is offered, those with HIV may still lack the ability to get specialized care and specific ART regimens.

=== HIV/AIDS disparities among undocumented immigrants ===
Immigrants are a significant population that does not test themselves for HIV/AIDS or even get treated for this illness. More specifically, undocumented immigrants are one of the leading immigrant populations that do not get tested or treated, and they make up a majority of uninsured people and lack access to healthcare. Language is one major barrier for immigrants, since many who are immigrants do not speak English as their first language, and the lack of language-inclusive information when it comes to ART or PrEP treatment decreases an immigrant's chance of getting the correct type of care necessary for HIV/AIDS. This barrier is especially true for undocumented Hispanic/Latino immigrants, where Spanish is their primary first language, and one interview-based study found that undocumented Hispanic/Latinos have a more challenging time finding someone who can explain to them information about HIV testing and treatment in their native language.

In addition, misconceptions of healthcare options for undocumented immigrants still exist, and this affects their chances of getting HIV testing. A study conducted in the New York metropolitan area found that undocumented immigrants who live with HIV/AIDS or are at risk refuse to visit a hospital or seek a medical provider to attend to their medical needs due to them not wanting to reveal their documentation status and not wanting to be deported. This fear is rooted in many undocumented people coming to the US for a better opportunity financially, educationally, and socially for themselves and their families, resulting in undocumented immigrants choosing not to risk and jeopardize their family or their future in the US to get tested or treated for HIV/AIDS. The belief of being deported for getting medical treatment is connected to misinformation spreading in the immigrant population, and many do not know that their immigration status does not turn them away from medical care, even more for HIV/AIDS treatment and testing.

=== Effects of COVID-19 Pandemic on people with HIV/AIDS ===
Inequities resulting from discrimination and stigma towards PLHIV can impact susceptibility to other public health threats. Discrimination in the housing, medical, and employment sectors towards PLHIV has helped to drive the COVID-19 public health threat in marginalized populations. Many of the groups most vulnerable to HIV infection, such as people of color or individuals living in poverty, are also at increased risk of contracting COVID-19. PLHIV also appear to be more likely to live in the areas hit hardest by COVID-19. The Kaiser Family Foundation found that 15 of the 20 counties with the highest HIV prevalence in the US were also ranked in the top 20 counties with the highest COVID-19 morbidity and mortality rates.

The effects of COVID-19 on people with HIV is still being studied. It is thought individuals of older age or with serious underlying medical conditions may be at greater risk for severe illness from COVID-19. This includes people with HIV who have comorbidities, a low CD4 cell count, or are not currently on effective HIV treatment. The Coronavirus Under Research Exclusion (CURE HIV-COVID) database collects information on outcome of COVID-19 in people living with HIV. According to the WHO, 23.1% of PLHIV hospitalized for COVID-19 died from the disease, making HIV a risk-factor for severe illness or death due to the virus. The CDC, WHO, and other health organizations have recommended that PLHIV are given priority for COVID-19 vaccination, and the CDC has recommended additional vaccine doses for PLHIV with advanced disease or who are not taking medication to treat their HIV. Some states have explicitly prioritized vaccination for people living with HIV, while others used the broader criteria of individual who are in an "immunocompromised state", which can include PLHIV.

At various points in the pandemic, hospitals were overwhelmed by the number of COVID-19 patients, some of whom required intensive treatments like invasive ventilation and extracorporeal membrane oxygenation (ECMO). As a result, there were serious concerns about the need to institute care rationing systems which would provide criteria for the prioritization of patients to receive medical attention and treatment. As there was little coordination between hospitals or guidance from local and state governments, many immunocompromised individuals, including PLHIV, were uncertain of the implications of these policies on their access to care. In March 2020, the Office for Civil Rights in the Department of Health and Human Services filed a complaint against Washington and Alabama for their care rationing policies, citing them as discriminatory against individuals with disabilities.

== Global perspective ==
While the existing discourse on HIV/AIDS-related discrimination largely focuses on the US, it is a worldwide issue. Countries such as South Africa, India, and Russia experience high levels of stigma and discrimination, often exacerbated by government policies or social attitudes. Recent global data indicate that approximately 39 million people are living with HIV/AIDS, with sub-Saharan Africa bearing the highest burden. In China, PLHIV have faced employment discrimination, while in Eastern Europe, HIV/AIDS stigma is often linked to drug use and marginalized communities. Many countries have laws that criminalize HIV transmission, exposure, or nondisclosure. These laws, found in parts of the US, Canada, and sub-Saharan Africa, often disproportionately impact marginalized communities and deter individuals from getting tested or seeking treatment due to fear of legal consequences. Human rights organizations argue that such laws fuel stigma and do not align with modern public health strategies.

However, global perspectives do address advocacy as well. Many countries have enacted anti-discrimination laws to protect PLHIV. The ADA in the US provides legal recourse against discrimination based on HIV status. India's 2017 HIV/AIDS (Prevention and Control) Act additionally bans discrimination in employment, education, and healthcare. The Indian Health Service created the Trans & Gender-Affirming Care in I/T/U Facilities Strategic Vision and Action Plan, which promotes an intersectional approach in research and services for patients with HIV. The Global Commission on HIV and the Law advocates for removing punitive laws that criminalize HIV exposure and transmission, which contribute to further stigmatization. Attitudes also differ based on religiosity in certain regions. Some groups, particularly in conservative communities, have perpetuated stigma by linking HIV/AIDS to "moral failings". On the contrast, many faith-based organizations, such as Catholic Relief Services and the Islamic Medical Association of Uganda, have provided critical support in HIV prevention, treatment, and education.

In recent years, changes in US foreign policy have significantly affected international HIV/AIDS relief efforts. Funding cuts to the President's Emergency Plan for AIDS Relief (PEPFAR) during the Trump administration placed millions of people at risk, particularly LGBTQ+ communities in Africa. According to projections published in The Lancet, without the continued support of PEPFAR, Africa could see one million additional child infections and half a million child deaths from HIV/AIDS by 2030. These policy shifts underscore how domestic political decisions in high-income countries can have global consequences for marginalized populations living with HIV.

== See also ==
- Criminalization of HIV transmission
- HIV exceptionalism
- Undetectable = Untransmittable

== Resources ==
- Positive Change Movement
