= Blue Veins (Pakistan) =

Pakistani women's health advocacy group

Blue Veins, based in Peshawar, Khyber Pakhtunkhwa, Pakistan is a women's health advocacy group. Its focus is on providing medical knowledge to underprivileged and rural women. Its mission includes empowering women to assert their rights and participate in fostering peaceful conflict resolutions.

== About ==
Blue Veins works with grassroots organizations for both men and women to secure and maintain women's rights in Khyber Pakthtunkhwa (KPK). This has included ensuring women have the right to vote in Peshawar. Blue Veins has also trained women on how to avoid harassment in the workplace.

Blue Veins has also helped transgender people in Pakistan. They have provided help and resources, such as giving out sewing machines to individuals in the transgender community.

Blue Veins is a member of the End Violence Against Women & Girls Alliance and also a member of Girls Not Brides.

== History ==
Blue Veins was founded by Qamar Naseem in 1999 first in order to spread information about breast cancer in communities such as Khyber Pakthtunkhwa (KPK) and Federally Administrated Tribal Areas (FATA). In 2013, Blue Veins partnered with KIOS, a Finnish NGO, to document sexual harassment "hotspots" in Pakistan. This project eventually led to 46 women being able to file cases, with Blue Veins' help. Also in 2013, Blue Veins launched a "Women's Manifesto", urging women to exercise their right to vote.

Blue Veins helped establish TransAction in KPK. In 2017, Blue Veins, along with TransAction Alliance have demanded legal protections for transgender people in KPK. KPK became the first province in South Asia to have legal protections for transgender people.

== See also ==
- Women related laws in Pakistan
