= Gene theft =

Acquiring another person's DNA without permission

Animation of DNA, a part of our identity.

In bioethics and law, gene theft or DNA theft is the act of acquiring the genetic material of another individual, usually from public places, without their permission. The DNA may be harvested from a wide variety of common objects such as discarded cigarettes, used condoms, coffee cups, and hairbrushes. In addition, a variety of people can be interested on collecting someone's genetic material. This includes the police, political parties, historians, professional sports teams, personal enemies, etc. DNA contains adequate amount of information about someone and it can be used for many purposes such as establishing paternity, proving genealogical connections or even unmasking private medical conditions.

== Criminal law ==
Currently, there are not many laws pertaining to the punishment that one may receive from obtaining the genetic material of others without their consent. However, due to the Health Insurance Portability and Accountability Act (HIPAA), one's genetic material cannot be given to their school or employer as the genome is a part of one's personal health data, but, law enforcement can have access to it without consent. This only occurs when a person is either a victim or a suspect of a criminal investigation.

Great Britain criminalized the acquisition of DNA without consent in 2006 at the urging of the Human Genetics Commission. Australia's legislature debated a two-year jail sentence for such theft in 2008. In the United States, eight states currently have criminal or civil prohibitions on such non-consensual appropriation of genetic materials. In Alaska, Florida, New Jersey, New York and Oregon, individuals caught swiping DNA face fines or short jail sentences. Lawsuits against "gene snatchers" are permitted in Minnesota, New Hampshire and New Mexico. In jurisdictions where such non-consensual taking of DNA is illegal, exceptions are generally made for law enforcement.

== Ethics ==
Many bioethicists believe that such conduct is an unethical invasion of human privacy. Professor Jacob Appel has warned that criminals may acquire the capability to copy DNA of innocent people and deposit it at crimes scenes, endangering the blameless and undermining a key tool of forensic investigation." In addition, there have been ethical concerns on law enforcement using the DNA of the family members of criminals to catch them. This concept was used for the Golden State Killer case in California, who was connected to at least 50 rapes and 12 murders between 1976 and 1986. After the case went cold, investigators used a website that compared the genetic information of those who had uploaded their information and found a relative of the killer.

However, others defend the appropriation of genetic material on the grounds that doing so may further human knowledge in productive ways. One particularly controversial case which received widespread attention in the media was that of Derrell Teat, a wastewater coordinator, who sought to acquire without consent the DNA of a man who was allegedly the last male descendant of her great-great-great-grandfather's brother. Another prominent case was a United States paternity suit involving film producer Steve Bing and billionaire investor Kirk Kerkorian.

== See also ==
- Genetic testing
- Genetic privacy
- Bioethics
- Forensic testing
