= Health advocacy =

Advocacy

Health advocacy or health activism encompasses direct service to the individual or family as well as activities that promote health and access to health care in communities and the larger public. Advocates support and promote the rights of the patient in the health care arena, help build capacity to improve community health, and enhance health policy initiatives focused on available, safe, and quality care.

There may be a distinction between patient advocates, who work specifically with or on behalf of individual patients and families, or in disease-specific voluntary associations, and health advocates, whose work is more focused on communities, policies or the system as a whole. Often, however, the terms "patient advocate" and "health advocate" are used interchangeably

== Patient-centered health advocacy ==
Health advocates are best suited to address the challenge of patient-centered care in our complex healthcare system. The Institute of Medicine (IOM) defines patient-centered care as: Health care that establishes a partnership among practitioners, patients, and their families (when appropriate) to ensure that decisions respect patients' wants, needs, and preferences and that patients have the education and support they need to make decisions and participate in their own care. Patient-centered care is also one of the overreaching goals of health advocacy, in addition to safer medical systems, and greater patient involvement in healthcare delivery and design.

Health advocates play a pivotal role in facilitating patient-centered care by ensuring that healthcare systems accommodate diverse cultural, linguistic, and socioeconomic needs. Advocacy efforts have shown significant potential in reducing healthcare disparities by incorporating culturally tailored strategies. For instance, health advocates working with immigrant populations often address critical barriers such as language gaps, lack of access to interpreters, and unfamiliarity with healthcare navigation processes. These barriers can hinder patients’ comprehension of their health conditions and limit their active participation in care decisions. Evidence-based practices in advocacy have demonstrated improved outcomes when healthcare providers and advocates collaborate to implement tailored communication strategies, including multilingual resources and cultural competence training for medical staff. Research highlights that embedding such advocacy within healthcare institutions has led to measurable improvements in patient satisfaction, treatment adherence, and health outcomes in underserved populations.

Patient representatives, ombudsmen, educators, care managers, patient navigators and health advisers are health advocates who work in direct patient care environments, including hospitals, community health centers, long term care facilities, patient services programs of non-profit organizations or in private, independent practice. They collaborate with other health care providers to mediate conflict and facilitate positive change, and as educators and health information specialists, advocates work to empower others.

== Community/policy-centered health advocacy ==
In the policy arenas health advocates work for positive change in the health care system, improved access to quality care, protection and enhancement of patient's rights from positions in government agencies, disease-specific voluntary associations, grassroots and national health policy organizations and the media. Health advocates have also been instrumental in shaping public health policies, particularly through efforts to expand access and enforce patient protections under the Affordable Care Act (ACA). By advocating for expanded Medicaid coverage, health advocates addressed critical gaps in healthcare access for low-income populations, ensuring millions of Americans received essential services. Their advocacy efforts also defended patients' rights to pre-existing condition protections, helping to eliminate discriminatory practices by insurers. Furthermore, health advocates have increasingly focused on racial and socioeconomic disparities, emphasizing policy changes aimed at equitable distribution of healthcare resources. Research underscores that these efforts have contributed to improved health equity, reduced mortality rates, and increased preventive care utilization in marginalized communities. These advocacy initiatives often involve multifaceted approaches, including lobbying for policy reforms, conducting public awareness campaigns, and partnering with community organizations to implement sustainable changes.

== Other areas of health advocacy ==
Rapidly growing areas of health advocacy include advocates in clinical research settings, particularly those focused on protecting the human subjects of medical research, advocates in the many disease-specific associations, particularly those centered on genetic disorders or widespread chronic conditions, and advocates who serve clients in private practice, alone or in larger companies. The rise of telemedicine and digital health technologies has created new opportunities for health advocacy. Digital health advocates now play a critical role in ensuring equitable access to telehealth services, especially for rural and underserved populations. They help address barriers such as limited broadband availability, lack of digital literacy, and disparities in access to reliable technology. Additionally, digital health advocates collaborate with healthcare providers to develop user-friendly telemedicine platforms that comply with data privacy regulations. During the COVID-19 pandemic, telehealth usage surged, and evidence suggests it significantly enhanced access to care for patients with chronic illnesses, mental health needs, and other conditions. However, disparities persist, particularly among older adults and individuals in low-income households. Health advocates focus on implementing programs such as free or subsidized internet access, digital literacy workshops, and public funding initiatives to expand telemedicine's reach. Advocacy in this sector is essential to ensuring that digital healthcare remains an integral, equitable part of modern medical systems.

== History ==
A separate and identifiable field of health advocacy grew out of the patient rights movement of the 1970s. This was clearly a period in which a "rights-based" approach provided the foundation of much social action. The initial "inspiration" for a "patient bill of rights" came from an advocacy organization, the National Welfare Rights Organization (NWRO). In 1970, the NWRO list of patients' rights was incorporated into the Joint Commission's accreditation standards for hospitals, and reprinted and distributed by the Boston Women's Health Book Collective—authors of Our Bodies, Ourselves—as part of their women's health education program. The preamble to the NWRO document became the basis for the Patient Bill of Rights adopted by the American Hospital Association in 1972.

The field of health advocacy also has deeper roots in the voluntary organization sector of society, where the early health advocates were more typically advocating for a cause, not for an individual. These health advocates preceded hospital-based patient advocates and are part of a long history of American involvement in social organizations. They were activists in social movements and voluntary associations including civic organizations, women's associations and labor organizations, and in the early disease-specific non-profits like the American Cancer Society (founded as the American Society for the Control of Cancer in 1913) or the March of Dimes (founded as the National Foundation for Infantile Paralysis in 1938). In the early part of the 20th century these advocates came to their work through other professional routes, often as social workers, attorneys, public health nurses or doctors. They were the Progressive era "new women" of Hull House and the Children's Bureau, the American Association for Labor Legislation leaders of the movement in 1919 for national health insurance, the nurses who worked with Lillian Wald to advocate for indigent health care through Visiting Nurse Services (1893), or with the Maternity Center Association (1918) to advocate for maternal and infant care for poor immigrants. They obtained their professional education in other disciplines and then applied it to health.

Health advocacy also has 20th century roots in community organizing around health hazards in the environment and in the workplace. The Love Canal Homeowners Association, for example, was founded in 1978 by Lois Gibbs and others concerned about the high rate of cancer and birth defects in the community. These grass roots advocates often begin with a concern about perceived "clusters" of disease. The Newtown Florist Club on the south side of Gainesville, Georgia was founded by women who pooled their money to buy wreaths for funerals in their community; in the 1980s they began to recognize that there were "far too many deaths due to cancer and lupus in the neighborhood. 'That put us on a wonder,'" said one resident, and now their advocacy includes toxic tours of the community. Health disparities and issues of environmental justice are often the focus of advocacy for low income and minority urban residents, and like West Harlem Environmental Action (WE ACT), their advocacy for environmental justice encompasses health concerns.

In developing nations, groups such as Blue Veins may face additional difficulties getting their messages out.

Recently disease specific advocacy and environmental health advocacy have come together, most noticeably in the adoption by advocates of the "precautionary principle". Some breast cancer advocacy groups in particular, argue that "prevention is the cure", when it comes to untested exposures that could be carcinogenic. Rachel's News is one example of such combined environmental and health advocacy information.

In the early 1990s Healthcare Advocates, Inc. determined that lobbyists (advocates) were helping the masses, but there were no organizations helping patients, one patient at a time. They developed a new model of advocacy that allowed patients to access services directly thereby resolving the issues associated with access to care and reimbursement through their employers.

By 2007, it was recognized that outreach to most patients who would need personal assistance from health advocates would have to come from the private sector. Individuals, some with backgrounds such as nursing or case management, and others who had experience helping loved ones or friend navigate the healthcare system, began establishing private practices to provide those services to client-patients. A new organization, The Alliance of Professional Health Advocates, was founded to support those new private advocates, plus those considering such a career, with legal, insurance, marketing and other business advice.

The Visiting Nurse Associations of America (VNAA) is also a nonprofit association which is a health advocate for its nonprofit visiting nurse agencies and home health providers. The VNAA relocated to DC from Boston in 2008 to be able to be a strong health advocate for its members.

== Professionalization ==
There were three critical elements of developing a profession on the table in these early years: association, credentialing and education. The Society for Healthcare Consumer Advocacy was founded as an association of mainly hospital-based patient advocates, without the autonomy characteristic of a profession: it was and is a member association of the American Hospital Association. These early hospital-based advocates believed some credentialing was important, but discussions foundered on the shoals of educational requirements credentialing would, of course, challenge the hegemony of the hospital as employer. They could not agree.

Ruth Ravich a founder of the pioneering patient advocacy program at Mt. Sinai Hospital in New York City, and some of her colleagues, decided to deal with this impasse by separating education from the more controversial credentialing. They turned to an academic environment as a base for the development of graduate professional education independent of the hospital "industry". The resulting master's program in Health Advocacy at Sarah Lawrence College was founded in 1980. In 1981, Ravich called professionalism and its underlying credentialing requirements one of the major issues facing the national organization. Professionalism—and the educational requirements that underlie a profession—is still a subject of heated debate among patient and health advocates.

In the history of every profession, there is a period in which a diverse group of practitioners work in various ways to "consolidate authority". For medicine, this period is best known for the Flexner Report (1910) that rated medical schools and gave a major boost to the AMA leadership and elite physicians who were trying to upgrade and standardize medical education. Educational standards for admission into the profession went along with earlier reorganization of the professional association—the AMA—to incorporate all practicing physicians (grandfathering in those who did not meet current standards), and a previous growth in state licensing that provided the legal authority for professional practice. For some professions consolidation never happens: nursing has spent a century debating educational standards, divided in identity, torn between being a labor force and a profession. In 1984, former Congressman (FL) Paul Rogers noted in his introductory essay to a volume on Advocacy in Health Care, "Advocacy in health care is a calling many of us have pursued—one way or another—for many years. And yet, it has not attained the full status of an independent profession."

By 2010, almost two dozen organizations had begun offering certificate programs, workshops and degrees in patient or health advocacy. Each year, more organizations, including colleges and universities offer such programs, satisfying the needs of the many people who are turning to careers in patient and health advocacy.

As of early 2014, there is no nationally or internationally recognized certification or other credential for advocates. A group of interested and involved parties in the private sector of advocacy started its work in 2012 to develop certification standards.

== Education in health advocacy ==
As of 2014, approximately 25 organizations and universities offer coursework specific to health advocacy. These opportunities range from weekend workshops, to webinars, to year-long certificate programs, and one master's program. Programs that offer graduate level credit include the Health Advocacy Program (HAP) at Sarah Lawrence College, offering a master's degree in health advocacy and the interprofessional Center for Patient Partnerships (CPP) at UW-Madison offering certificates in Consumer Health Advocacy. Faculty from both programs co-wrote a book chapter describing their pedagogy and curriculum, and comparing and contrasting their programs. Assumption College in Worcester, MA also offers a fully online Master of Arts in Health Advocacy and Professional Certificate in Patient Advocacy.

In 2015, the University of Illinois at Chicago created the Legislative Education and Advocacy Development (LEAD) Experience to train inter-professional groups of pediatrics residents, public health students, and fourth-year medical students to think critically about health care, analyze policy, and communicate effectively about policy through the method of legislative briefing.

Founded in 2000, the Center for Patient Partnerships at the University of Wisconsin began offering two graduate certificates in 2008: the "Graduate" certificate, which students pair with their graduate/professional studies in various disciplines (e.g. law, social work, nursing), and the "Capstone" certificate, in which post-baccalaureate students enroll before entering graduate/professional school (e.g. public health, medicine, public policy, health administration). Beginning fall 2012, CPP also offers a "Professional" certificate.

== Certification and licensing ==
Health advocates are not certified or licensed specifically as health or patient advocates because no national or international standards exist to define the work or the skills required. Some educational organizations that offer courses or certificates in health and patient advocacy claim they also provide certification, but those certificates are specific only to those programs.

In 2012, a group of interested parties working in educational institutions, hospitals, and as individual health advocates came together to begin forming a credential or certification program for advocates.

== Health Advocates Association ==
In spring 2006 a small group of independent health advocates came together in Shelter Rock, Long Island, New York to discuss whether there was a need for a professional association of health advocates.

There were at least two specific events that precipitated the Shelter Rock retreat. One was a "Patient Advocacy Summit II" held in Chapel Hill, North Carolina, in March 2005. At this meeting, issues of credentialing, professionalization of advocates, development of competencies for the field, and tensions between "lay" and "professional" advocates arose repeatedly.

The second precipitating event was a meeting at the Genetic Alliance conference in Washington D.C. in July 2005. Numerous members of the Genetic Alliance had requested a society or association of disease-specific advocates, offering disease-specific advocates a professional trade association, health insurance benefits and credentialing. The idea was subsequently abandoned by this group after a number of meetings via phone indicated hat there was too much diversity in advocate's understanding of what such an organization should entail. In addition, the advocates decided that there was too much difference between disease-specific advocates and 'health' advocates.

The Shelter Rock group determined a need for a Health Advocates Association (proposed name). It would be an organization of individual health/patient advocates not of health advocacy organizations. The Association would be an open membership association with no standardized credentialing, but would adopt a statement of ethical guidelines, to which members would agree to adhere.

The National Association of Healthcare Advocacy Consultants (NAHAC), was created in 2009, and is headquartered in Berkeley, California. Of the initial list of members, most were registered nurses and social workers.

Between 2007 and 2009, the Alliance of Professional Health Advocates was established to support independent patient advocates in developing their professional knowledge, credentials, and private health advocacy practices. The organization subsequently expanded its activities to include guidance on business operations and ethical practices within the health advocacy profession. The Alliance also established the annual H. Kenneth Schueler Patient Advocacy Compass Award to recognize contributions to private patient advocacy. The award is named after H. Kenneth Schueler, who was among the early practitioners to establish an independent health advocacy practice in the United States.

In Australia, both patient and disability advocacy are becoming common through groups like Patient Advocates Australia and Disability Health Advocates Australia.

== See also ==
- Patient advocacy
- Patient participation
- Genetic Alliance
- International Women's Health Coalition
- International Men's Health Week
- National Council on Aging
- List of healthcare reform advocacy groups in the United States
- Anti-vaccine activism
- Conflict of interest in the healthcare industry
