= HIV exceptionalism =

HIV exceptionalism is the term given to the trend to treat HIV/AIDS in law and policy differently from other diseases, including other sexually transmitted, infectious, lethal diseases. The term first appeared in print in an article in the New England Journal of Medicine in 1991.

HIV exceptionalists emphasize the human rights of people living with HIV/AIDS, particularly their rights to privacy, confidentiality, and autonomy. They also believe that all people seeking an HIV test always require special services, such as counseling with every HIV test, special informed consent paperwork, and guaranteed anonymity in public health reporting. In many places, it is illegal to disclose HIV test results over the phone or over the Internet.

That is motivated partly by a desire to reduce the likelihood of suicide in recently diagnosed people. Other goals include encouraging people to consent to the test by, for example, preventing the government from associating a positive test result with an identifiable individual and preventing other healthcare professionals from learning that the individual has ever been tested, even if the test result is negative.

As treatment regimes, understanding of the pandemic, and awareness about HIV/AIDS stigma and discrimination evolve, more scholars argue for an end to HIV exceptionalism. HIV exceptionalism in testing increases bureaucratic burden, reduces the availability of HIV testing, and stigmatizes it as something "special," rather than a normal part of healthcare.

== Implications ==
HIV exceptionalists believe that despite advances in HIV disease treatment, compelling evidence indicates a social stigma associated with HIV/AIDS that continues to cause frequent discrimination against and rejection of people with HIV/AIDS. Discrimination against persons with HIV typically originates with irrational fears about casual transmission of HIV or on societal devaluation of specific sexual identities and behaviors (gay men, men on the "down low," bisexual men, MSM, anal sex, multiple sexual partners, transactional sex) and illegal substance use (injection drug users of illegal narcotics). HIV-positive victims of discrimination continue to experience loss of employment and housing, and they also report being denied access to social and medical services in many regions of the US and the world, specifically because of their HIV status. Many HIV-positive people in the US and around the world continue to be ostracized, arrested, beaten, and even murdered because of their status. Many HIV-positive people report recent experiences of rejection by spouses, family members, friends, co-workers, neighbors, whole communities, and religious institutions.

HIV-positive people have turned to online HIV-dating websites in an attempt to pursue romantic/sexual relationships, but their right to do is dependent on them proactively protecting others from the virus. It is their responsibility to disclose their HIV-positive status, and the duty is fully on them to ensure they prevent the spreading of their infection. Social structures are organized in a way that people living with HIV feel that they are unable to pursue "normal" intimate relationships unless they turn to alternative means. While disclosure of HIV-positivity is framed as an individual right, it is in practice enacted as an imperative to prevent transmission. Many HIV-positive people actually express a strong preference for HIV-positive partners and use dating websites as a way to meet them. Thus, seeking out partners who are also living with HIV is a way to share the virus and live with it together. This is a means of normalizing HIV, which is what these HIV-dating websites attempt to do. Although the websites allow HIV-positive people to form relationships easier, they are needed only because HIV is still so heavily stigmatized, and participation in online dating continues to reinforce normative standards of conduct.

AIDS exceptionalists emphasize the human rights of people living with HIV/AIDS, particularly their rights to privacy, confidentiality, and autonomy that protect them against discrimination. They also believe that people seeking an HIV test require services such as pretest counseling (including risk assessment, harm reduction behavioral interventions and suicidal ideation screening), written informed consent, and the option of anonymous rather than confidential HIV testing. In many places, it is illegal to disclose HIV test results over the phone or over the internet because the test results may be inadvertently disclosed to someone other than the person who has been tested.

AIDS exceptionalists also believe that the decriminalization of behaviors that may lead to HIV transmission as well as the option of anonymous testing will encourage more people to seek HIV testing. In the US, states have different regulations governing the reporting of HIV or AIDS cases to local or state health departments. Some states require the release of individually identifying information with an HIV-positive test result, but other states do not. Similarly, regulations vary as to whether healthcare professionals may have access to the information without the patient's written consent. Since all health care professionals are required to practice universal precautions with every patient to protect themselves against blood-borne disease, it is, in some states, illegal to inform a provider of a patient's HIV status for the sole purpose of protecting the health care provider against HIV. The practice of universal precautions is considered to be sufficient for the provider's protection.

== Opposition ==
Most opponents of HIV exceptionalism believe that social stigma is no longer an important variable in testing and treating people living with HIV/AIDS. Citing improvements in treatment regimes, a better understanding of the pandemic, and greater awareness about HIV/AIDS stigma and discrimination, more public health professionals are arguing for an end to HIV exceptionalism. They believe that HIV exceptionalism in testing increases bureaucratic burden, reduces the number of health care providers that make HIV testing available to all adolescent and adult patients without regard to perceived risk, and stigmatizes testing as something "special" instead of a normal part of healthcare. Opponents of HIV exceptionalism believe that by destigmatizing HIV testing and treatment in the medical arena, the sexual and needle-sharing behaviors that may result in HIV infection can be destigmatized.

== See also ==
- Criminal transmission of HIV
- Genetic exceptionalism
