= ABCC6 =

Protein-coding gene in the species Homo sapiens

Identifiers
- Aliases: ABCC6, ABC34, ARA, EST349056, GACI2, MLP1, MOAT-E, MOATE, MRP6, PXE, PXE1, URG7, ATP binding cassette subfamily C member 6
- External IDs: OMIM: 603234; MGI: 1351634; GeneCards: ABCC6
Enzyme activity
| EC # | BRENDA | ExPASy | KEGG | MetaCyc |
|---|---|---|---|---|
| 7.6.2.3 | ↗ | ↗ | ↗ | ↗ |

Gene location (Human)
| Chr. | Chromosome 16 (human) |
| Band | 16p13.11 | Start | 16,149,565 bp |
| Band | 16p13.11 | End | 16,223,522 bp |

Gene location (Mouse)
| Chr. | Chromosome 7 (mouse) |
| Band | 7 29.64 cM|7 B3 | Start | 45,616,979 bp |
| Band | 7 29.64 cM|7 B3 | End | 45,679,726 bp |
RNA expression pattern
| Bgee | Human / Mouse (ortholog); Top expressed in: right lobe of liver; duodenum; body of pancreas; human kidney; mucosa of transverse colon; renal cortex; upper lobe of left lung; body of stomach; right lung; right adrenal cortex / Top expressed in: liver; left lobe of liver; yolk sac; lamina propria of urinary bladder; proximal tubule; right kidney; vein; detrusor urinae muscle; embryo; jejunum; More reference expression data |
| BioGPS | n/a |
Gene ontology
| Molecular function | ATPase-coupled transmembrane transporter activity; nucleotide binding; ATPase activity; ATP binding; ATPase-coupled inorganic anion transmembrane transporter activity; transporter activity; transmembrane transporter activity |
| Cellular component | endoplasmic reticulum; membrane; integral component of membrane; basolateral plasma membrane; endoplasmic reticulum membrane; nucleus; plasma membrane; apical plasma membrane; lateral plasma membrane; vacuolar membrane |
| Biological process | response to stimulus; visual perception; transmembrane transport |
Sources:Amigo / QuickGO
Orthologs
| Databases | NCBI: entry; OMA: entry |
| Species | Human | Mouse |
| Entrez | 368 | 27421 |
| Ensembl | ENSG00000275331; ENSG00000091262 | ENSMUSG00000030834 |
| UniProt | O95255 | Q9R1S7 |
| RefSeq (mRNA) | NM_001079528; NM_001171; NM_001351800 | NM_018795 |
| RefSeq (protein) | NP_001072996; NP_001162; NP_001338729 | NP_061265 |
| Location (UCSC) | Chr 16: 16.15 – 16.22 Mb | Chr 7: 45.62 – 45.68 Mb |
| PubMed search |
- Wikidata
| View/Edit Human | View/Edit Mouse |

Multidrug resistance-associated protein 6 (MRP6) also known as ATP-binding cassette sub-family C member 6 (ABCC6) and multi-specific organic anion transporter E (MOAT-E) is a protein that in humans is encoded by the ABCC6 gene. The protein encoded by the ABCC6 gene is a member of the superfamily of ATP-binding cassette (ABC) transporters.

ABC proteins transport various molecules across extra- and intra-cellular membranes. ABC genes are divided into seven distinct subfamilies (ABC1, MDR/TAP, MRP, ALD, OABP, GCN20, White). This protein is a member of the MRP subfamily which is involved in multidrug resistance.

== Pathology ==
Mutations in this protein cause pseudoxanthoma elasticum (PXE). The most common mutations, R1141X and 23-29del, account for about 25% of the found mutations.

Premature atherosclerosis is also associated with mutations in the ABCC6 gene, even in those without PXE.

Deficiency of Abcc6 in mouse models of ischemia leads to larger infarcts, which can be rescued by Abcc6 overexpression.

== Location ==
Abcc6 gene encodes an intracellular transporter associated with mitochondrial function, located in the mitochondrial-associated membrane (MAM), whereas its substrate can be located in either MAM, cytosol or ER. Abcc6 is primarily expressed in liver and kidney,.
