= Pseudoxanthoma elasticum =

Genetic disease in which elastic fibers in certain tissues harden

- Other names: Grönblad–Strandberg syndrome; Groenblad-Strandberg syndrome
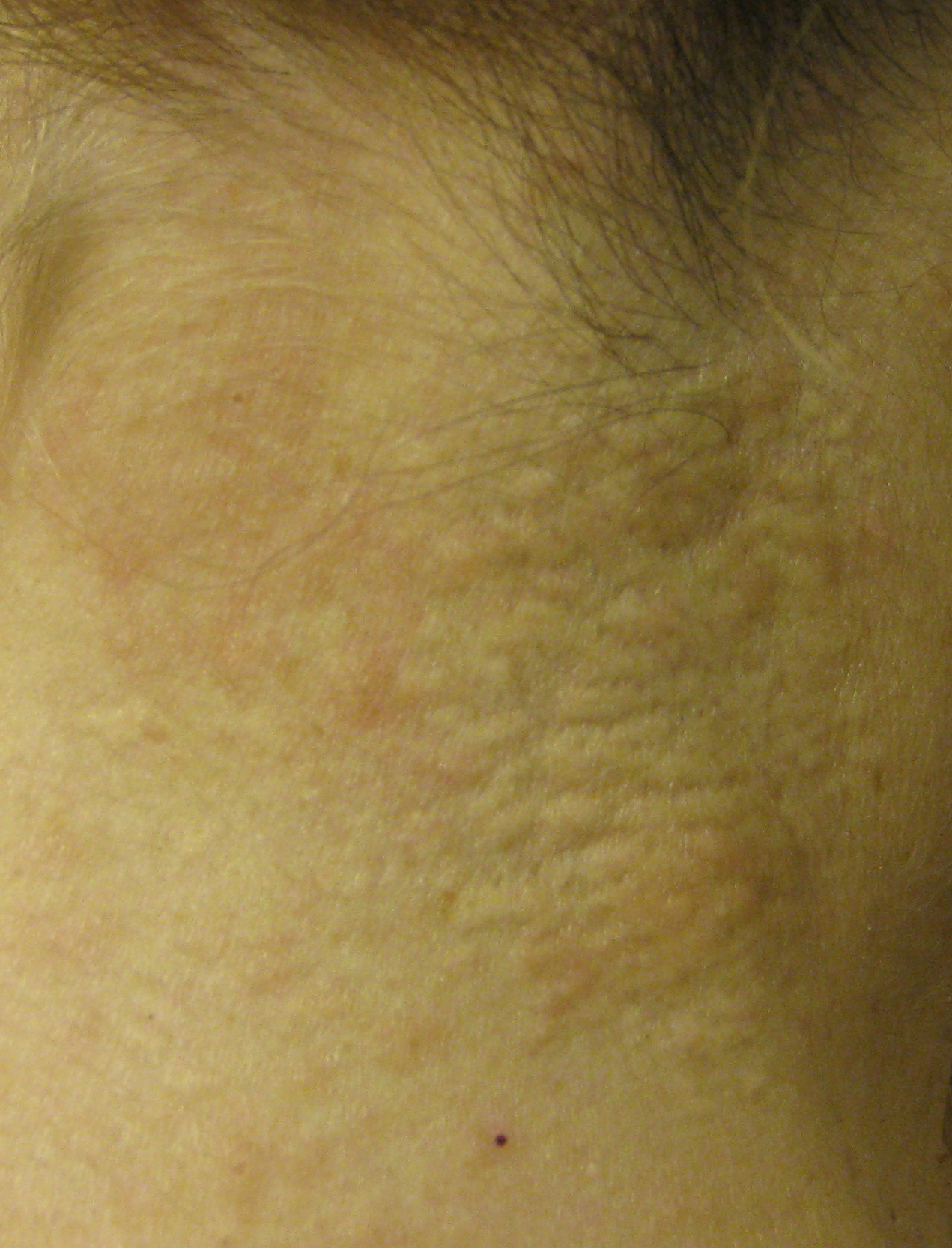
- Pseudoxanthoma elasticum of the posterior lateral neck. Note the yellowish slightly raised bumps characteristic of this condition.
- Specialty: Medical genetics
- Frequency: 0.005%

Pseudoxanthoma elasticum (PXE) is a genetic disease that causes mineralization of elastic fibers in some tissues. The most common problems arise in the skin and eyes, and later in blood vessels in the form of premature atherosclerosis. PXE is caused by autosomal recessive mutations in the ABCC6 gene on the short arm of chromosome 16 (16p13.1).

== Signs and symptoms ==
=== Dermatological manifestations ===
Usually, pseudoxanthoma elasticum affects the skin first, often in childhood or early adolescence. Small, yellowish papular lesions form and cutaneous laxity mainly affect the neck, axillae (armpits), groin, and flexural creases (the inside parts of the elbows and knees). Skin may become lax and redundant. Many individuals have "oblique mental creases" (horizontal grooves of the chin). The lesions are asymptomatic and have a stochastic pattern of growth and spread.

=== Ocular manifestations ===
Pseudoxanthoma elasticum (PXE) causes progressive, abnormal calcification of Bruch's membrane in the central retina, producing a characteristic pattern of fundus changes and multiple vision-threatening complications. Early disease shows peau d'orange, a speckled mid-peripheral pattern marking the transition between normal retina and the enlarging central zone of confluent calcification. As Bruch's membrane becomes increasingly brittle, angioid streaks—fractures radiating from the optic disc—form and enlarge with age, predisposing strongly to choroidal neovascularization (CNV). CNV commonly emerges in mid-adulthood, recurs, and can lead to hemorrhage, scarring, and permanent loss of central vision. Independent of CNV, chronic dysfunction of the calcified membrane drives macular atrophy, causing enlarging scotomas and declining acuity.

Pre-clinical functional impairment includes delayed dark adaptation, likely from hindered nutrient and retinoid transport across the mineralized Bruch's membrane. Imaging also reveals choriocapillaris flow loss and reduced choroidal perfusion beneath calcified areas, likely another secondary alteration due to the mineralized Bruch's membrane.

PXE is also associated with a high prevalence of optic disc drusen, which correlate with disease severity and contribute to visual field defects and progressive inner retinal thinning. Finally, PXE eyes exhibit reduced ocular compliance, showing more prolonged intraocular pressure spikes after intravitreal injections—an important consideration when treating their frequent CNV.

=== Cardiovascular manifestations ===
PXE is caused by mineralization in connective tissues in mainly the skin, eyes, and blood vessels. As a result of mineralized buildup in the vascular wall, patients may be at a greater risk for intermittent claudication, a condition in which cramping pain in the leg is induced by exercise, and peripheral artery disease. Occlusions in cerebral arteries can lead to reduced or blocked blood flow, resulting in serious complications including transient ischemic attack (TIA) and stroke. Similarly, blockages in the coronary circulatory system, also called coronary artery disease may develop, leading to angina and myocardial infarction (heart attack). Cerebral ischemia in PXE is caused by small vessel occlusive disease.

=== Other manifestations ===
Although not much is known about potential gastroenterological manifestations, gastrointestinal bleeding is a rare symptom and usually involved bleeding from the stomach.

Other rare neurological complications may include intracranial aneurysms, subarachnoid and intracerebral hemorrhages.

== Genetics ==
Pseudoxanthoma elasticum has an autosomal recessive pattern of inheritance.

80% of clinical cases of pseudoxanthoma elasticum have detectable mutations in the ABCC6 gene. Mutations in almost all parts of the gene have been described, of all types (missense, nonsense, splice alteration, insertion, small deletion or large deletion). Although there have been reports of autosomal dominant inheritance, the inheritance is typically autosomal recessive (both parents need to be carriers, and there is a 25% chance that a child will inherit both abnormal copies of the gene and therefore develop the condition).

Strong genetic linkage was found with mutations in the ABCC6 gene, which codes for the ABCC6 protein, which is a membrane transporter from the large ATP-binding cassette transporter family. The protein is expressed in most organs, but mainly in the liver and kidney. ABCC6 mediates ATP release in the liver. This is the main source of circulating pyrophosphate (PPi), and individuals affected by PXE have strongly reduced plasma PPi levels, explaining their mineralization disorder. One study suggested that mutations causing total absence of an ABCC6 protein caused a more severe disease, but this could not be confirmed in a subsequent case series. Given the variations in age of onset and severity it is likely that other unknown risk factors (genetic, environmental, and lifestyle) may be involved.

Premature atherosclerosis is also associated with mutations in the ABCC6 gene, even in those without PXE. A syndrome almost indistinguishable from hereditary PXE has been described in patients with hemoglobinopathies (sickle-cell disease and thalassemia) through a poorly understood mechanism. In addition, there appears to be another PXE-like syndrome with a similar phenotype but as a result of problems with another gene, gamma-glutamyl carboxylase. Mutations in ABCC6 can also cause generalized arterial calcification of infancy. In some cases of PXE, mutations in ABCC6 cannot be found, and other genes such as ENPP1 may be implicated.

== Pathophysiology ==
In PXE, there is mineralization (accumulation of calcium and other minerals) and fragmentation of the elastin-containing fibers in connective tissue, but primarily in the midlaminar layer of the dermis, Bruch's membrane and the midsized arteries. Recent studies have confirmed that PXE is a metabolic disease, and that its features arise because metabolites of vitamin K cannot reach peripheral tissues. Low levels of PPi cause mineralization in peripheral tissues.

== Diagnosis ==
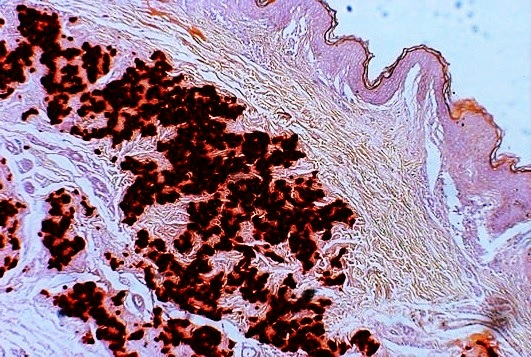
Histopathology of pseudoxanthoma elasticum: Fragmentation and calcification of middermal elastic fibers on Alizarin Red staining.

The diagnostic criteria for PXE are the typical skin biopsy appearance and the presence of angioid streaks in the retina. Criteria were established by consensus of clinicians and researchers at the 2010 biennial research meeting of the PXE Research Consortium. and confirmed at the 2014 meeting These consensus criteria state that definitive PXE is characterized by two pathogenic mutations in the ABCC6 or ocular findings – angioid streaks > 1 DD or peau d'orange in an individual <20 years of age together with skin findings:

- Characteristic pseudoxanthomatous papules and plaques on the neck or flexural creases.
- Diagnostic histopathological changes in lesional skin: Calcified elastic fibers in the mid and lower dermis, confirmed by positive calcium stain

== Treatment ==
There is no confirmed treatment that directly interferes with the disease process.Cosmetic surgery to remove excessive skin has been used to improve aesthetic appearance in PXE patients but because of the non-life-threatening nature of these symptoms, should be used with caution.

One of the most critical symptom of PXE is choroidal neovascularization which can lead to deterioration of central vision. Photodynamic therapy has been used as a treatment, but this has been replaced with endothelial growth factor (VEGF) inhibitors (such as bevacizumab, ranibizumab, and aflibercept) with efficacy similar to their use in treatment of age-related macular degeneration.

To limit cardiovascular symptoms, reduction of cardiovascular risk factors through lifestyle changes is recommended. Generally clinicians recommend avoidance of non-steroidal anti-inflammatory drugs (NSAIDS) that increase bleeding risk, such as aspirin, and ibuprofen to prevent eye and gastrointestinal bleeding.

Formerly, dietary restriction of calcium was tried with no benefit, and in fact accelerated mineralization in mice. There are a number of potential treatments that are currently being tested or have just undergone testing including magnesium, etidronate, PPi, and tissue-nonspecific alkaline phosphatase inhibitors.

Given that ABCC6 heterozygous mutations result in few symptoms of PXE, this disease is a candidate for gene therapy. Some initial proof-of-principle experiments have been done in mice that have relieved some of symptoms of PXE, but as with all gene therapy treatments, there are many hurdles that must be overcome including insuring that the treatment will be long-lasting and reducing the risk of insertional mutagenesis and severe immune reactions.

== Epidemiology ==
The reported prevalence of pseudoxanthoma elasticum is about 1:25,000. Females are twice as likely to be affected as males. The disease occurs in all ethnicities, but Afrikaners are more likely to have PXE as a result of a founder effect (i.e., higher prevalence in the small group of people from whom Afrikaners descend).

== History ==
The first description of PXE that distinguished it from other xanthoma conditions was by Dr Ferdinand-Jean Darrier in 1896. The eponym "Grönblad-Strandberg syndrome" is used in older literature, after two physicians who made further discoveries in the disease manifestations.

PXE has the distinction of being the only disease for which a layperson is the discover of the mutated gene. The ABCC6 gene mutation was discovered simultaneously by four research teams, all of which published at the same time. The principal investigators were (in order of the date of publication): Jouni Uitto, Arthur Bergen, Charles Boyd, and Klaus Lindpainter. The gene was patented by Charles D. Boyd, Katalin Csiszar, Olivier LeSaux, Zsolt Urban, Sharon Terry, and assigned to PXE International by these co-inventors. Between the filing and 2013, when the Supreme Court of the United States declared that genes may not be patented. PXE International freely licensed the gene to any lab for clinical testing and research. PXE International continues to hold and maintain other patents (diagnosis and treatment patents).

PXE International, a support organization, was founded in 1995, by Patrick and Sharon Terry, following the diagnosis of their two children. It has a registry of 4,600 affected individuals.

== Images ==
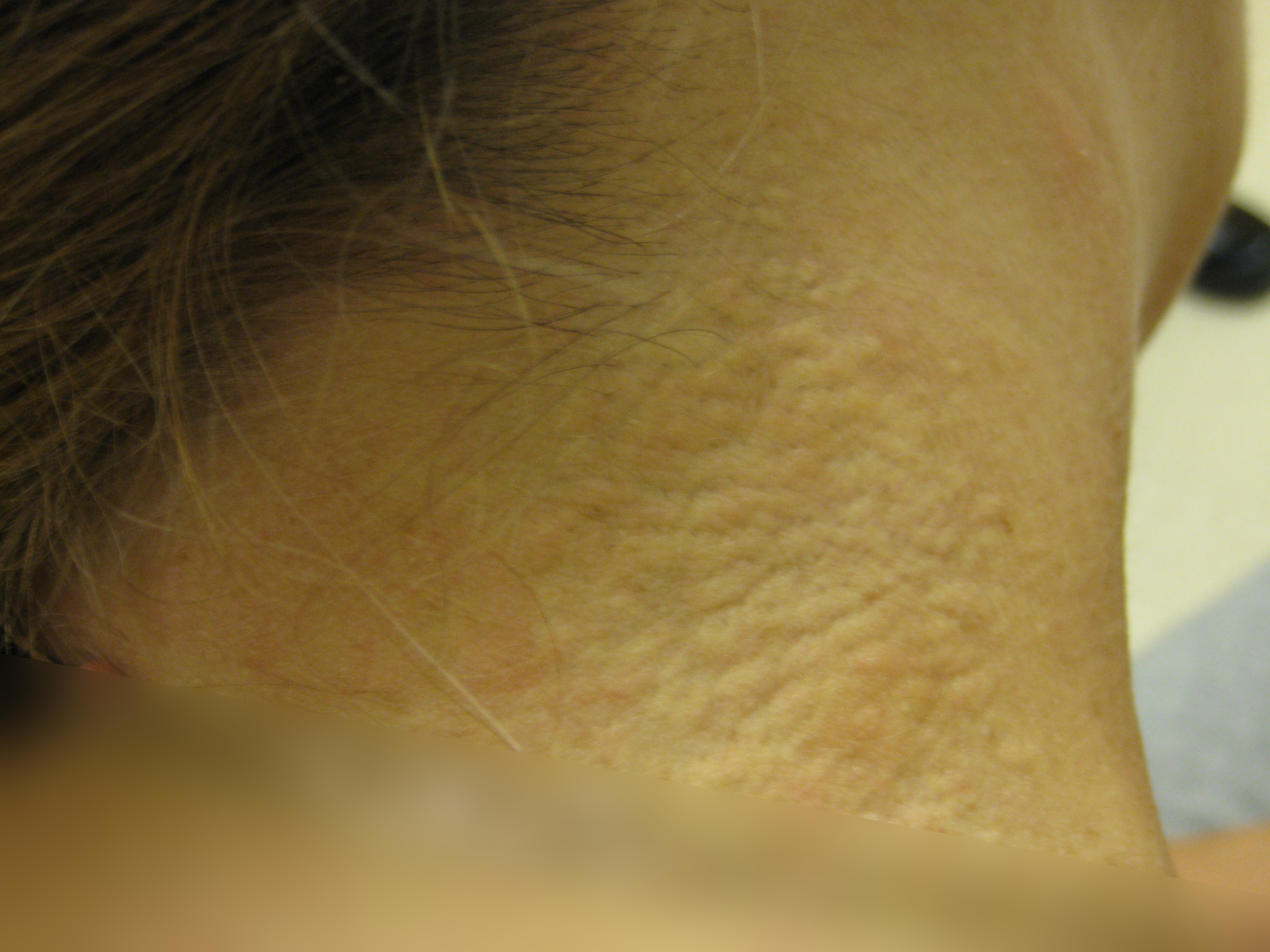
Pseudoxanthoma elasticum of the posterior lateral neck.

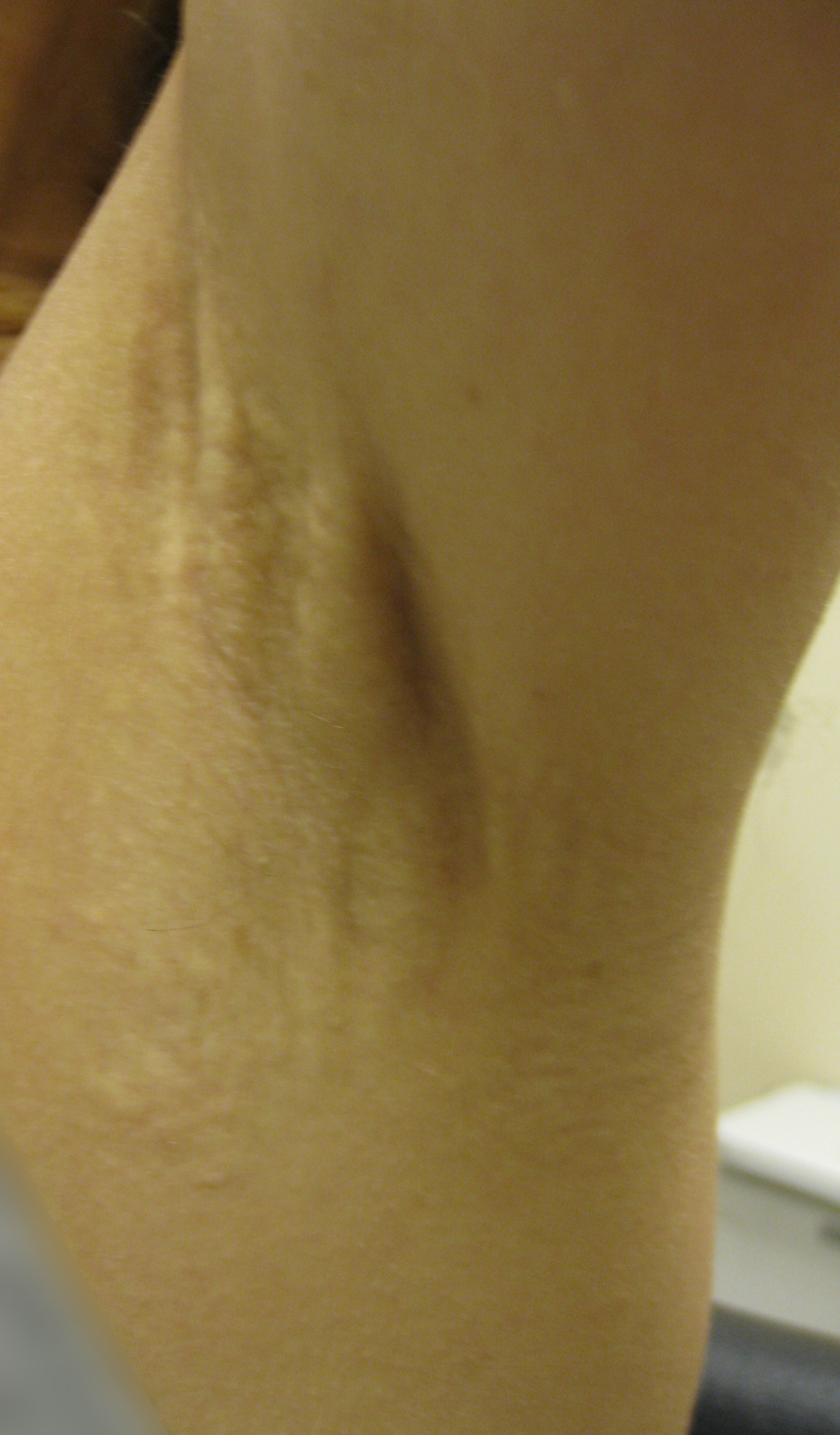
Pseudoxanthoma elasticum of the left axillary fold.

== See also ==
- List of cutaneous conditions
