= Genetic exceptionalism =

Genetic exceptionalism is the belief that genetic information is special and so must be treated differently from other types of medical data or other personally identifiable information.

For example, patients are able to obtain information about their blood pressure without involving any medical professionals, but to obtain information about their genetic profile might require an order from a physician and expensive counseling sessions. Disclosure of an individual's genetic information or its meaning, such as telling a woman with red hair that she has a higher risk of skin cancer, has been legally restricted in some places, as providing medical advice.

That policy approach has been taken by state legislatures to safeguard individuals' genetic information in the United States from individuals, their families, their employers, and the government. The approach builds upon the existing protection required of general health information provided by such laws as the Health Insurance Portability and Accountability Act.

== Expert debate ==
There is ongoing debate over whether or when certain genetic information should be considered exceptional. In some cases, the predictive power of genetic information (such as a risk for a disease like Huntington's disease, which is highly penetrant) may justify special considerations for genetic exceptionalism, in that individuals with a high risk for developing this condition may face a certain amount of discrimination. However, for most common human health conditions, a specific genetic variant only plays a partial role, interacting with other genetic variants and environmental and lifestyle influences to contribute to disease development. In these cases, genetic information is often considered similarly to other medical and lifestyle data, such as smoking status, age, or biomarkers.

== See also ==
- Genetic privacy
- HIV exceptionalism, similar rules for HIV/AIDS testing
