= Genetic Alliance =

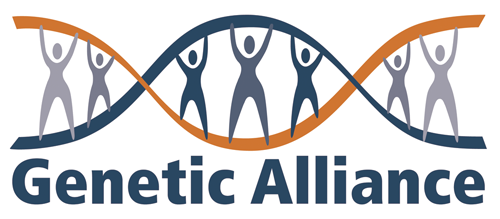
- Founded: 1986
- Type: Charitable organization, 501(c)(3)
- Tax ID no.: 521571905
- Purpose: Genetic Alliance improves health through the authentic engagement of communities and individuals. We employ innovation through novel partnerships, connected consumers, and smart services.
- Key people: Sharon F. Terry, President and Chief Executive Officer
- Website: www.geneticalliance.org
- Formerly called: Alliance of Genetic Support Groups

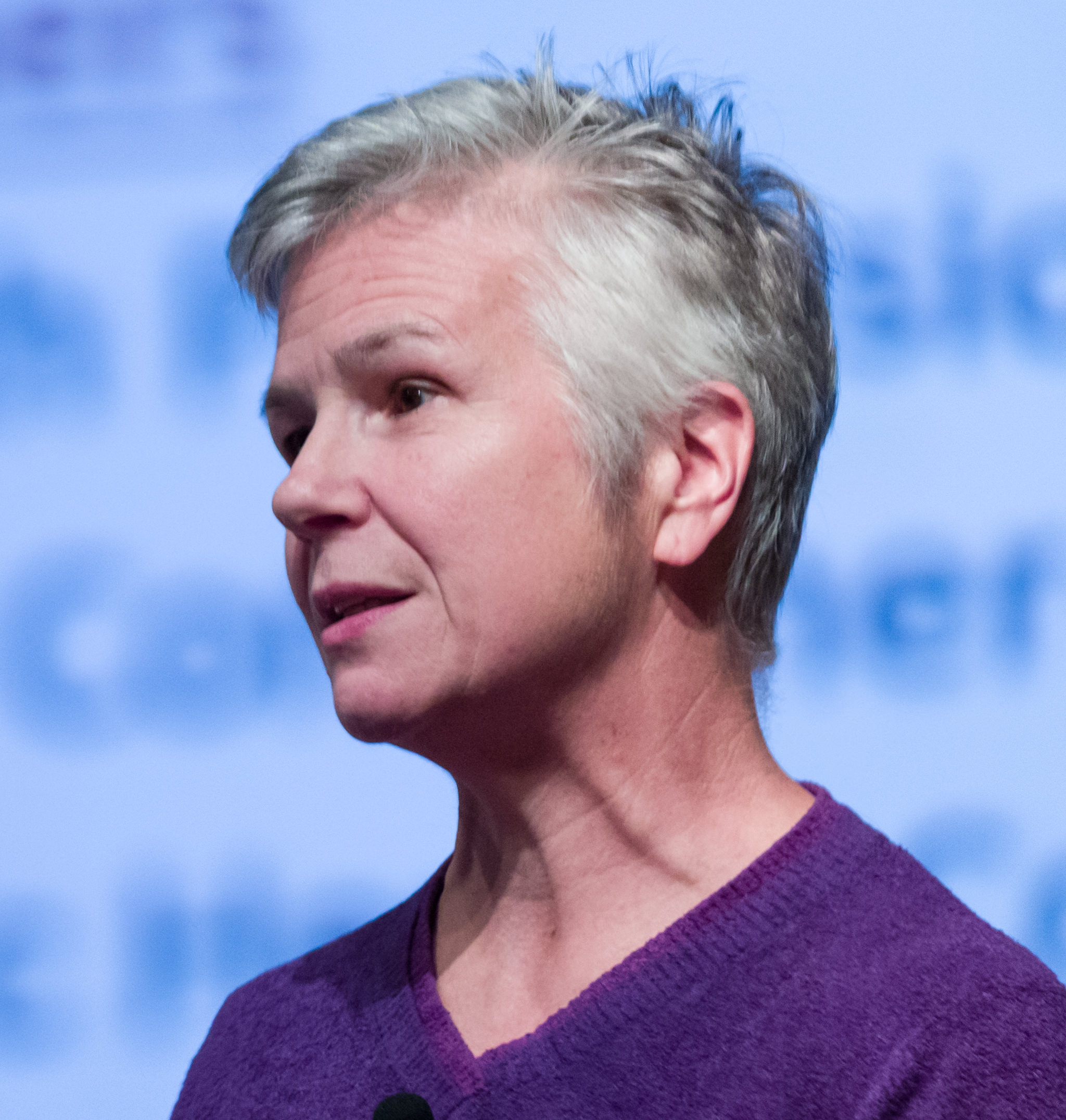
President and CEO Sharon F. Terry in 2017

Genetic Alliance is a nonprofit organization, founded in 1986 by Joan O. Weiss, working with Victor A. McKusick, to advocate for health benefits in the accelerating field of genomic research. This organization is a network of over 1,000 disease advocacy organizations, universities, government organizations, private companies, and public policy organizations. They aim to advance genetic research agendas toward health benefit by engaging a broad range of stakeholders, including healthcare providers, researchers, industry professionals, public policy leaders, as well as individuals, families and communities. They create programs using a collaborative approach, and aim to increase efficiency and reduce obstacles in genetic research, while ensuring that voices from the involved disease communities are heard. They also promote public policies to advance healthcare. Genetic Alliance provides technical support and informational resources to guide disease-specific advocacy organizations in being their own research advocates. They also maintain a biobank as a central storage facility for several organizations who otherwise would not have the infrastructure to maintain their own repository.

== History ==
The organization was founded in 1986 by Joan O. Weiss, working with Victor A. McKusick, to advocate for health benefits in the accelerating field of genomic research. The organisation is an umbrella organisation for a number of charities dealing with genetic diseases. The founding chair of the Genetic Alliance in 1989 was Ann Mercy Hunt who had founded the Tuberous Sclerosis Association.

== Genetic Alliance Registry and Biobank ==
Genetic Alliance manages a biobank, the Genetic Alliance Registry and Biobank (GARB), which is a cooperatively-managed clinical data and tissue sample repository. GARB was established in 2003, and combines its standardized infrastructure with the interests and motivations of disease advocacy groups to develop effective diagnostic tools and treatments, to “accelerate the research enterprise beyond its usual pace and involving new players, the advocates.” Individual disease advocacy organizations maintain control over their data and samples throughout the research process, while enabling collaboration among scientists by leveraging their resources: well-characterized, robust data sets including pooled samples from people with the disease.

Participating organizations store their data and samples in GARB for on-going use in research, with the goal of developing new diagnostic tools and treatments for diseases. Genetic Alliance provides the facility, collection, processing and archiving of samples stored in the biobank, as well as training and tools for organizations to effectively participate in this resource. GARB is governed collaboratively by an advisory board, with representatives from the seven currently participating organizations, which determines policies regarding stewardship, protection and usage of the data. GARB has an institutional review board (IRB), which approves data collection protocols, material transfer agreements, and documents used in informed consent and minor assents.

Organizations participating in GARB pay an annual fee to have access to GARB's IRB-approved protocols, training and technical assistance, and infrastructure for tissue banking. Stored data include “DNA, RNA, cell lines, tissue, organs, self-reported data, medical images, medical records,” amounting to over 30,000 samples and clinical records. Researchers can apply for access to samples and data in GARB via the advocacy organization responsible for them.

GARB was based on a biobank established by PXE International in 1995. PXE International is a disease advocacy organization, founded by Sharon Terry and Patrick Terry. In managing their biobank, they developed a series of protocols and systems for data collection, storage and use. Their efforts contributed to significant scientific advances, including the discovery of the gene responsible for Pseudoxanthoma elasticum (PXE). Drawing from their experiences, they began mentoring other disease advocacy organizations in developing new biobanks. The founders of the PXE International biobank established GARB to provide a new model for facilitating research, “on the principal that a shared infrastructure would facilitate easy flow of resources and accelerate disease-specific research.” A central value upon which GARB was established is a respect for specimen donors as participants in a dynamic community-engaged process. Samples and data may be reused in many research studies, and re-contacting participants is possible to ensure on-going interaction and communication with those who donate to GARB.
