= Genetic Information Nondiscrimination Act =

Anti-discrimination act in the US

Genetic Information Nondiscrimination Act of 2008
- Long title: An act to prohibit discrimination on the basis of genetic information with respect to health insurance and employment.
- Acronyms (colloquial): GINA
- Enacted by: the 110th United States Congress
- Effective: May 21, 2008

Citations
- Public law: 110-233
- Statutes at Large: 122 Stat. 881

Codification
- Acts amended: Employee Retirement Income Security Act; Public Health Service Act; Internal Revenue Code of 1986; Social Security Act of 1965; Fair Labor Standards Act
- Titles amended: 29, 42
- U.S.C. sections amended: 29 U.S.C. § 216(e); 29 U.S.C. § 1132; 29 U.S.C. § 1182; 29 U.S.C. § 1182(b); 29 U.S.C. § 1191b(d); 42 U.S.C. § 300gg-1 42 U.S.C. § 300gg-1(b); 42 U.S.C. § 300gg-21(b)(2); 42 U.S.C. § 300gg-22(b); 42 U.S.C. § 300gg-51 et seq. 42 U.S.C. § 300gg-61(b); 42 U.S.C. § 300gg-91 42 U.S.C. § 300gg-91(d); 42 U.S.C. § 1395ss 42 U.S.C. § 1395ss(o); 42 U.S.C. § 1395ss(s)(2)

Legislative history
- Introduced in the House of Representatives as H.R. 493 by Louise Slaughter (D-NY) on January 16, 2007; Committee consideration by Education and Labor, Energy and Commerce, Subcommittee on Health, and Ways and Means; Passed the House on April 25, 2007 (420-3); Passed the Senate on April 24, 2008 (95-0) with amendment; House agreed to Senate amendment on May 1, 2008 (414-1); Signed into law by President George W. Bush on May 21, 2008

The Genetic Information Nondiscrimination Act of 2008 (Pub. L. 110–233 (text) (PDF), 122 Stat. 881, enacted May 21, 2008, GINA /ˈdʒiː.nə/ JEE-nə), is an Act of Congress in the United States designed to prohibit some types of genetic discrimination. The act bars the use of genetic information in health insurance and employment: it prohibits group health plans and health insurers from denying coverage to a healthy individual or charging that person higher premiums based solely on a genetic predisposition to developing a disease in the future, and it bars employers from using individuals' genetic information when making hiring, firing, job placement, or promotion decisions. Senator Ted Kennedy called it the "first major new civil rights bill of the new century." The Act contains amendments to the Employee Retirement Income Security Act of 1974 and the Internal Revenue Code of 1986.

In 2008, on April 24 H.R. 493 passed the Senate 95–0. The bill was then sent back to the House of Representatives and passed 414–1 on May 1; the lone dissenter was Congressman Ron Paul. President George W. Bush signed the bill into law on May 21, 2008.

== Legislative history ==
=== Preliminary bills ===
In the 104th Congress (1995–1996) several related bills were introduced.

- The Genetic Privacy and Nondiscrimination Act of 1996, S. 1416: Sen. Mark Hatfield and H.R. 2690: Rep. Clifford Stearns
- The Genetic Fairness Act of 1996, S. 1600: Sen. Dianne Feinstein
- The Genetic Information Nondiscrimination in Health Insurance Act of 1995, H.R. 2748: Rep. Louise Slaughter and S. 1694: Sen. Olympia Snowe
- Genetic Confidentiality and Nondiscrimination Act of 1996, S. 1898: Sen. Pete Domenici

In 1997, the Coalition for Genetic Fairness (CGF) was formed by several patient and civil rights groups to spearhead genetic nondiscrimination legislation on Capitol Hill. The CGF became the primary non-governmental driver of Federal genetic non-discrimination legislation.

In 2003, GINA was introduced as H.R. 1910, by Louise Slaughter, D-NY, and as S. 1053 by Senator Snowe, R-ME.

In 2005, it was proposed as H.R. 1227 by Representative Biggert, R-IL, and as S. 306 by Senator Snowe, R-ME.

The Genetic Information Nondiscrimination Act of 2007 was introduced into the United States House of Representatives as H.R. 493 by Representatives Slaughter, Biggert, Eshoo, and Walden. It passed the House by a 420 - 9 - 3 vote on April 25, 2007. It was led by Genetic Alliance.

=== Final legislation ===
The same bill was introduced into the United States Senate as S. 358 by Senators Olympia Snowe, Ted Kennedy, Mike Enzi, and Christopher Dodd. On April 24, 2008, the Senate approved the bill 95–0, with five senators not voting (including presidential candidates McCain, Clinton, and Obama). It had been subject of a "Secret hold" placed by Tom Coburn, Republican U.S. senator from Oklahoma.

The bill was then sent back to the House of Representatives and passed 414–16–1 on May 1, 2008 (the lone dissenter was Congressman Ron Paul). President George W. Bush signed the bill into law on May 21, 2008.

== Regulation ==
On May 17, 2016, the Equal Employment Opportunity Commission (EEOC) amended various GINA regulations providing further clarification on acceptable workplace wellness programs. The new guidelines are effective on July 16, 2016. The new amendments require that (1) employee wellness programs are voluntary; (2) employers cannot deny health care coverage for non participation, or (3) take adverse employment actions against or coerce employees who do not participate in wellness programs. Additionally, the new GINA regulations cover spousal participation in wellness programs and employers may not ask employees or covered dependents to agree to permit the sale of their genetic information in exchange for participation in wellness plans.

== Debate during consideration ==
=== Arguments for ===
Along with an overview of the topic, the NIH National Human Genome Research Institute states that "NHGRI believes that legislation that gives comprehensive protection against all forms of genetic discrimination is necessary to ensure that biomedical research continues to advance. Similarly, it believes that such legislation is necessary so that patients are comfortable availing themselves to genetic diagnostic tests." This point of view thus regards GINA as important for the advancement of personalized medicine.

The Coalition for Genetic Fairness presents some arguments for genetic nondiscrimination. As of 2007, their argument makes the claim that because all humans have genetic anomalies, this would prevent them from accessing medication and health insurance. The coalition also cites the potential for misuse of genetic information.

The GINA legislation has historically received support from the majority of both Democrats and Republicans, as evidenced by the 420–3 vote in 2007 by the House of Representatives.

=== Arguments against ===
The National Association of Manufacturers, the National Retail Federation, the Society for Human Resource Management, the United States Chamber of Commerce, and other members of the Genetic Information Nondiscrimination in Employment Coalition (GINE) say the proposed legislation is overly broad and are concerned the bills would do little to rectify inconsistent state laws and hence might increase frivolous litigation and/or punitive damages as a result of ambiguous record-keeping and other technical requirements. In addition, they are concerned that it would force employers to offer health plan coverage of all treatments for genetically related conditions.

Insurance industry representatives argued that they may need genetic information. Without it, more high-risk people would buy insurance, causing rate unfairness.

== Limitations and calls for extension ==
While GINA has been cited as a strong step forward, some say that the legislation does not go far enough in enabling personal control over genetic testing results. The law does not cover life, disability, or long-term care insurance, which may cause some reluctance to get tested.

Some legal scholars have called for the addition of a "disparate impact" theory of action to strengthen GINA as a law.

== 2017 proposal to reduce protection ==
On 8 March 2017 during the 115th Congress (2017–2018), HR 1313 - Preserving Employee Wellness Programs Act - was introduced by Committee on Education and the Workforce Chairwoman Virginia Foxx and cosponsored by Subcommittee on Health, Employment, Labor, and Pensions Chairman Tim Walberg, Elise Stefanik, Paul Mitchell, Luke Messer and Tom Garrett. Employers would have been able to demand workers' genetic test results if the bill were to have been enacted. The bill was reported out of committee to the full House for debate, but it was not passed before the congressional term ended.

== See also ==
- Employment Non-Discrimination Act
- Genetic discrimination
- Genealogical DNA test
- Gattaca
- Genetic privacy
