= Two Jacks =

- Promotional poster
- Directed by: Bernard Rose
- Written by: Bernard Rose
- Based on: Two Hussars by: Leo Tolstoy
- Produced by: Julia Verdin
- Starring: Danny Huston; Sienna Miller; Jacqueline Bisset; Jack Huston
- Cinematography: Bernard Rose
- Release dates: August 25, 2012 (Montréal World Film Festival); October 18, 2013 (United States)
- Country: United States
- Language: English

Two Jacks is a 2012 comedy-drama film written and directed by Bernard Rose starring Sienna Miller and Danny Huston. It is an adaptation of Leo Tolstoy's 1856 short story "Two Hussars" and is Rose's fifth Tolstoy adaptation, following Anna Karenina (1997), Ivans XTC (2002), The Kreutzer Sonata (2008) and Boxing Day (2012). The film premiered in competition at the Montreal World Film Festival (August 23 to September 3, 2012).

== Plot ==
In 1992, Jack, a legendary filmmaker, returns to Hollywood after a long absence. He is looking to secure finance for his new film project. His return to Tinseltown is heralded by a series of adventures, as he drinks freely, seduces a beautiful woman named Diana, quarrels with studio executives and finally procures funds for his new project by winning a poker game.

Twenty years on, the filmmaker's son arrives in Hollywood looking to make his directorial debut amid questions of whether he has inherited his father's gift.

== Cast ==
- Danny Huston as Jack Hussar Senior
- Sienna Miller as Diana
- Jacqueline Bisset as Diana—twenty years later
- Jack Huston as Jack Hussar Junior
- Billy Zane as Max Faraday
- Izabella Miko as Dana
- Jamie Harris as Colin
- Richard Portnow as Lorenzo
- Lydia Hearst as Alexis
- Guy Burnet as Paul
- Hannah Cowley as Angel
- Julie Marcus as Intercom Voice
