= Matthew Jacobs =

British writer, director, producer and actor

- Born: 1956 (age 69–70)
- Occupations: Writer, director, producer, actor

Matthew Julian B. Jacobs (born 1956) is a British writer, director, producer and actor. He is known best for his extensive career writing for television shows like Doctor Who and The Young Indiana Jones Chronicles. He also directed two prize-winning TV movies for BBC films, Hallelujah Anyhow (1992) and Mothertime (1998).

== Early life ==
Jacobs was born in Marylebone in 1956, the son of the actor Anthony Jacobs and his second wife, Ann Jameson. Jameson died by suicide in 1963, when Jacobs was seven years old. His father had previously been married to the actress Katherine Blake, and he has a half-sister from that marriage.

Jacobs's father was Jewish; Jacobs practices no religion.

In 1966, his father appeared in the Doctor Who serial The Gunfighters and took his son to visit the set during production.

== Career ==
Jacobs worked as one of the many writers for George Lucas's The Adventures of Young Indiana Jones. His episodes included "Passion for Life", "The Perils of Cupid", "Travels with Father", "Spring Break Adventure", "Attack of the Hawkmen", and "Hollywood Follies."

Jacobs is perhaps best remembered for writing and co-producing the 1996 Doctor Who television movie, which featured Paul McGann as the Doctor and Eric Roberts as the Master. Jacobs was responsible for writing the first televised Doctor Who story to be broadcast as a show in its own right, rather than as part of a charity telethon, since Survival (1989).

Jacobs has also written several screenplays. His film credits include Lassie, The Emperor's New Groove and the cult classic Paperhouse.

Aside from his work in television and film, Jacobs has worked on other projects in the entertainment industry. He wrote for the video games Outlaws and Star Wars: Starfighter.

In 2011, while working in San Francisco, Jacobs befriended the rabbi Lawrence Kushner, and they worked together to write a film called Your Good Friend.

Jacobs starred with Danny Huston in Boxing Day (2012), Bernard Rose's adaptation of Leo Tolstoy's novella "Master and Man".

== Filmography ==
=== Films as crew ===
Year	Title	Director	Writer	Producer	Editor	Notes
1984	The Ninja Mission	No	Yes	No	No	
1984	Starship	No	Yes	No	No	
1986	Vardo	Yes	No	No	No	Short film
1986	Smart Money	No	Yes	No	No	
1988	Paperhouse	No	Yes	No	No	
1994	Lassie	No	Yes	No	No	
2000	The Emperor's New Groove	No	Story	No	No	
2013	Justin and the Knights of Valour	No	Yes	No	No	
2013	Your Good Friend	Yes	Yes	Yes	Yes	Directorial debut
2014	Bar America	Yes	Yes	No	Yes	
2015	Rebel Child	No	No	Associate	No	Short film
2018	The Hurdy Gurdy Man	No	No	Yes	No	Short film; also first assistant director
2019	Claude Debussy's Danse Profane	No	No	Yes	No	Short film
2022	Doctor Who Am I	Yes	No	Yes	No	Documentary film

=== Films as actor ===
Year	Title	Role	Notes
2008	Lo que Daria por volver	BBC Narrator (voice)	Short film
2008	The Kreutzer Sonata	Driver	
2010	Mr. Nice	Eddie Laxton	
2010	The Two Handed Painter	Producer (voice)	Short film
2010	The Seven Year Hitch	Himself	Documentary film
2011	You're Cordially Uninvited	Mr. Badeaux	Short film
2012	Boxing Day	Nick	
2013	Your Good Friend	Jules	
2014	Bar America	Harry	
2015	On Her Wedding Day	Policeman (voice)	Short film
2015	Frankenstein	Dr. Marcus	
2015	Art School of Horrors	Zadok	
2017	State of Modern Love	Josh	
2018	The Hurdy Gurdy Man	Narrator (voice)	Short film
2018	Vice	Antonin Scalia	
2021	On My Special Day	The Caller	Short film
2021	Traveling Light	Arthur	
2022	Doctor Who Am I	Himself	Documentary film
TBA	Lear Rex	Duke of Cornwall	Post-production

=== Television as screenwriter ===
Year	Title	Notes
1989	The Jim Henson Hour	Episode: "Monster Maker"
1989	Somewhere to Run	TV film
1990	Lorna Doone	TV film
1990–1992	The Ruth Rendell Mysteries	Episodes: "Some Lie and Some Die: Part One"; "Murder Being Once Done: Part One"; "Kissing the Gunner's Daughter: Part One"
1991–1997	Screen Two	Episodes: "Hallelujah Anyhow" (also director); "Mothertime" (also director)
1992–1996	The Young Indiana Jones Chronicles	Episodes: "British East Africa, September 1909"; "Vienna, November 1908"; "Princeton, February 1916"; TV films: "The Adventures of Young Indiana Jones: Hollywood Follies"; "The Adventures of Young Indiana Jones: Attack of the Hawkmen"; "The Adventures of Young Indiana Jones: Travels with Father"
1996	Doctor Who	TV film: "Doctor Who: The Movie" (also co-producer)
2002	Mr. St. Nick	TV film (story only)

=== Television as actor ===
Year	Title	Role	Notes
1968	Point Counter Point	Little Phil	4 episodes
1975	Play for Today	Wulf	Episode: "By Common Consent"
1997	Screen Two	Recording Engineer	Episode: "Mothertime"
2018	All You Need Is Me	Barman	2 episodes
2020	Tardis Sauce	Himself	Episode: "The Time Lord's New Groove"

== Writer for video games ==
- Outlaws (1997, dialogue)
- Star Wars: Starfighter (2001)
