= Smart Money =

Smart Money may refer to:

- Smart Money (1931 film), a 1931 American motion picture
- Smart Money (1986 film), a 1986 BBC film
- SmartMoney, a financial magazine
- Maya (mobile payments), a financial services brand formerly known as Smart Money

== See also ==
- Smart money index, used for financial analysis
