= Matthew Yang King =

American television actor

- Education: New York University (BFA)
- Occupation: Actor
- Years active: 1998–present
- Children: 3

Matt Yang King is an American actor. He appears in the Netflix series Avatar: The Last Airbender as Appa and Momo, in Pixar's Elemental and the Netflix series Not Quite Narwhal, as well as Riverdale, Powers, 24, Strong Medicine, and Numbers. He created the short films The World of Steam, The Duelist and has provided voiceover work for numerous television shows, video games, and commercials including Love, Death & Robots, Studio Ghibli's 25th Anniversary English dub of Only Yesterday with Daisy Ridley, the World of Warcraft franchise, Cyberpunk 2077, G.I. Joe: Renegades, Transformers: Robots in Disguise, Fortnite, Supah Ninjas, and Marvel Heroes.

== Early life ==
King studied acting at New York University Tisch School of the Arts and lived in New York until 1998, when he left to tour the United States with the musical Titanic, playing Quartermaster Robert Hichens and Bandsman Bricoux. The tour began in Los Angeles.

== Career ==
=== Voice acting ===
King has provided numerous voices for television, film, and video games. His work includes Father and Kozou in Studio Ghibli's Only Yesterday, Illidan Stormrage in the World of Warcraft franchise, Persuader in Justice League vs. the Fatal Five, Atom in Injustice 2, Eian in Batman Ninja, and Splinter and Shredder in the Teenage Mutant Ninja Turtles franchise. King is the voice of Apple in numerous television ads and also voiced both Liu Kang and Fujin in Mortal Kombat 11 and also voiced Kung Lao in the animated film Mortal Kombat Legends: Battle of the Realms.

Additionally, King was one of the creators and hosts of the long-running podcast, GeeksOn, with Aaron Hendricks, Donald Marshall, and Peter Gamble Robinson.

=== Film and television ===
King has had recurring roles on Riverdale, Numbers, 24, and Strong Medicine. He starred opposite Danny Huston in the Bernard Rose film The Kreutzer Sonata, which also features King playing the violin.

=== Stage ===
King's stage credits include the first Broadway touring production of Titanic: The Musical, East West Players' Yankee Dawg You Die as Bradley with Sab Shimono and The Tempest as Caliban with fellow NYU Tisch alumnus Daniel Dae Kim, and an NAACP award-winning hip-hop version of The Two Gentlemen of Verona called 2G's at Los Angeles' Sacred Fools Theater.

=== Writing ===
Frustrated with playing stereotypically Asian roles in the early-mid 2000s, King began writing to create roles for minority actors "that people felt they could wrap their brains around that were about being ethnic...[and] racism." The Harrowing, his script with Peter Gamble featuring an African-American man as the lead in a horror film is in development.

=== Crowdfunding projects ===
In 2017, King collaborated with cartoonist Ellipsis Stephens and fellow producers Phil LaMarr and Danielle Stephens to bring Stephen's webcomic, Goblins, to life as an animated series. The Goblins Animated campaign on Indiegogo was to produce a five-minute long mega-trailer/pilot that could be used to garner more interest in the project. King himself voices one of the characters, Fumbles. Notable voice actors make up the rest of the cast, including Phil LaMarr as Complains of Names, Billy West as Minmax, Maurice LaMarche as Forgath, Jim Cummings as Thaco, Tara Strong as Saves a Fox, Matthew Mercer as Big Ears, Jennifer Hale as Kin, and Steve Blum as Kore. The mega-trailer is currently under production.

In 2012, King created a Kickstarter project for his steampunk webseries called The World of Steam. Written, directed, and produced by King, the show is set in a Twilight Zone-type steampunk universe and featured Scott Folsom, Gail Folsom, Gina Torres, Mido Hamada, Karl E. Landler, Julian Curtis, Robin Atkin Downes, and King himself as the host, Mr. Liang. At the time, the series was the highest-grossing webseries ever on Kickstarter. The first episode, The Clockwork Heart, was released as a webisode in 2013 and contains music by composer Bear McCreary. The remainder of the series is still in the works and is being developed for television.

=== Steampunk work ===
After the creation of the World of Steam webseries in 2012, King was seen as a leader in the Steampunk creative community. As a result, he was invited to serve as one of the three judges on the first-ever network Steampunk-themed reality show, Game Show Network's Steampunk'd in 2015. King cites his Steampunk influces as H.G. Wells, Jules Verne, H.P. Lovecraft, K.W. Jeter, Robert Howard, Sir Arthur Conan Doyle, and China Mieville, among others. He collaborated with Scott and Gail Folsom from the League of STEAM on the pilot episode for the World of Steam, "The Clockwork Heart," and was cited in the 2016 book, Like Clockwork: Steampunk Pasts, Presents, and Futures, edited by Rachel A. Bowser and Brian Croxall. His Love, Death and Robots episode, "Good Hunting," is Asian-inspired Steampunk. King has appeared at various Steampunk conventions as a presenter and judge, and is currently collaborating with Cheyenne Wright of Girl Genius on a new Steampunk project called The Cabinet of Curiosities.

=== Convention appearances ===
Date	Convention	Location	Activity	Notes
2009	VCON 34	Vancouver, British Columbia, Canada	Guest of Honor: GeeksOn podcast	
2014	Midwest Media Expo (M2X)	Detroit, Michigan	Panel host/panelist: The World of Steam	Inaugural year for this convention
2018	Clockwork Alchemy	Burlingame, California	Speaker and presenter	

== Filmography ==
=== Live action roles ===
==== Television ====
Year	Title	Role	Notes
2001	Crossing Jordan	Dr. Yeung	Episode: "Blue Christmas"
2001	ER	Rick	Episode: "Four Corners"
2002	MDs	2nd Year Student	Episode: "Time of Death"
2002	The West Wing	Staffer	Episode: "Hartsfield's Landing"
2002	Friends	The Student	Episode: "The One Where Joey Dates Rachel"
2003	Threat Matrix	Broker #2	Episode: "Pilot"
2003	The Even Stevens Movie	Scott	TV movie
2003	Frasier	Thad	Episode: "Daphne Does Dinner"
2003–2006	Strong Medicine	Dr. Matt Linn, First Year, First Year Medical Student	27 episodes
2004	It's All Relative	Matthew	Episode: "Our Sauce, It Is a Beauty"
2005	The New Partridge Family	Benjamin	TV movie
2005	CSI: Crime Scene Investigation	Yak #2	Episode: "Snakes"
2005–2010	Numbers	Matt Li, Technician, Crime Scene Tech, Tech, FBI Tech Agent, FBI Computer Tech #1, FBI Tech Agent #2	14 episodes
2007	CSI: NY	Kim Wey	Episodes: "Child's Play"
2008	Eli Stone	Tommy Woo	2 episodes
2009	Washington Field	SA Mark Chen	TV movie
2009	Bones	Dr. Marcus Scheer	Episode: "The Cinderella in the Cardboard"
2010	Hub Exclusive: G.I. Joe Renegades & Transformers Prime	Himself, Interviewee	TV short
2010	24	Agent King	4 episodes
2011	NCIS: Naval Criminal Investigative Service	Min Ho Kwon	Episode: "A Man Walks Into a Bar..."
2012	Criminal Minds	Detective Harrison Chen	Episode: "Magnificent Light"
2013	Monday Mornings	Tsung Mai	Episode: "Communion"
2013–2015	The World of Steam	Mr. Liang, Producer, Writer, Director, co-director, Executive Producer	Webseries creator; Funded through Kickstarter
2015	Steampunk'd	Himself - Judge	8 episodes
2015	Revenge	Agent Lin	Episode: "Bait"
2016	The Last Ship	Zhou	Episode: "Legacy"
2016	Powers	THX	2 episodes
2016	Grimm	Jin Akagi	Episode: "Inugami"
2016	Teenange Mutant Ninja Turtles: Don vs. Raph	Splinter / Shredder	Short
2017	Lucifer	Adrian Yates	Episode: "Welcome Back, Charlotte Richards"
2017	Training Day	Agent Lawrence Park	Episode: "Faultlines"
2017	Rosewood	Jason Hiyashi	Episode: "Radiation & Rough Landings"
2017	Hashtag Awareness: The Webseries	Todd	Episode: The One Where Tim is a Creeper"
2018	Code Black	Pilot Randy Woodman	Episode: "Cabin Pressure"
2018	9-1-1	Actor	Episode: "Next of Kin"
2018–2022	Riverdale	Marty Mantle	7 episodes
2019	Cabinet of Curiosities	Director, writer	Episode: "The Secret Language of Flowers"

==== Film ====
Year	Title	Role	Notes
2004	Species III	Specialist Robert Kelley	
2005	Call Center	Sam	Short film
2008	The Mummy: Tomb of the Dragon Emperor	Stunts (motion capture)	
2008	The Kreutzer Sonata	Aiden	
2010	Acts of Violence	Bob	
2011	How to Spot a Narcissist	Narcissist Matt	Short film
2012	Red Dawn	North Korean Soldier	
2013	Sid the Science Kid: The Movie	Yang Yang	
2016	Loveology	Rev. James	Short film
2016	The Short Sale	The Gun	Short film
2016	Garbage Day	Director, executive producer, Writer	Short film
2019	Afterthoughts	Detective Jay Vittidini	Short film
2020	Sightless	Doctor Katsuro	

=== Voice over roles ===
==== Film ====
Year	Title	Role	Notes
2008	Turok: Son of Stone	Young Nashoba, Young Cliff Brave	
2009	Trail of the Panda	Scientist	Uncredited; English dub
2012	Hipster Holocaust	Narrator	Short film
2012	Back to the Sea	Dabao	
2015	Justice League: Throne of Atlantis	Stephen Shin	
2016	Only Yesterday	Father, Kazou	25th Anniversary; English dub
2016	TMNT: Don vs Raph	Splinter, Shredder	Short film
2018	Batman Ninja	Eian	English dub
2018	Sitting Duck	John	Short film
2019	Justice League vs. the Fatal Five	Persuader	
2021	Bright: Samurai Soul	Koketsu	Credited as Matt Yang King
2021	The Witcher: Nightmare of the Wolf	Luka	Credited as Matt Yang King
2021	Mortal Kombat Legends: Battle of the Realms	Kung Lao	
2023	Elemental	Alan Ripple, Lutz, Earth Pruner	Credited as Matt Yang King
2023	Mortal Kombat Legends: Cage Match	Concierge, Costumed Man	
2024	Inside Out 2	Additional Voices	Credited as Matt Yang King

==== Television ====
Year	Title	Role	Notes
2006	Naruto	Sumaru	6 episodes; English dub
2010–2011	G.I. Joe: Renegades	Tunnel Rat, Nicky Lee, Cobra Guard, Operations Tech, Pilot, Cobra Guard #1, Torch, County Clerk, Technician, Cobra Trooper #3	25 episodes
2011–2013	Supah Ninjas	Yamato	32 episodes
2014	Regular Show	Surfer 2, Merle, Yuji	2 episodes
2016–2017	Transformers: Robots in Disguise	Simacore, Computer Voice	2 episodes
2016–2017	New Looney Tunes	Male Executive, Raccoon Scout	2 episodes
2018–2023	Baki	Tokugawa, Shibukawa	11 episodes; English dub
2019	The Lion Guard	Bambun, Dughi, Old Civet	4 episodes
2019	Goblins Animated	Fumbles, Producer	Mega trailer
2019	Love, Death & Robots	Adult Liang, Renshu, Young Man, Host	2 episodes; Credited as Matt Yang King
2021	Trese	Captain Guerrero, Dominic	
2021–2024	What If...?	Additional Voices	3 episodes
2022	Robot Chicken	Scorpion, Dogbert	Episode: "May Cause a Squeakquel"
2023	Abominable and the Invisible City	Mr. Lung	Episode: "Shack Attack"
2023	Star Wars: Young Jedi Adventures	Loden Greatstorm	Episode: "Charhound Chase"
2024–present	Avatar: The Last Airbender	Appa, Momo	15 episodes
2024	Creature Commandos	Liu Kang	Episode: "The Iron Pot"; archival audio from Mortal Kombat 1
2024	Squid Game	Player 230 (Choi Su-bong, "Thanos")	English Dub Voice dub for Choi Seung-hyun.

==== Video games ====
Year	Title	Role	Notes	Source
2002	Warcraft III: Reign of Chaos	Illidan Stormrage	Named the #1 most iconic character Blizzard ever created by Comic Book Resources in 2018	
2003	Warcraft III: The Frozen Throne	Illidan Stormrage	Named the #1 most iconic character Blizzard ever created by Comic Book Resources in 2018	
2004	Transformers	Unicron		
2007	Uncharted: Drake's Fortune	Pirates #4		
2008	Valkyria Chronicles	Maximilian	English dub	
2008	Mercenaries 2: World in Flames	The Allies - China		
2009	The Saboteur	Kwong, Louis, Franz		
2009	Dragon Age: Origins	Additional voices		
2009	Uncharted 2: Among Thieves	Pirate		
2009	Infamous	Male Pedestrian		
2010	Valkyria Chronicles II	Maximilian	English dub	
2010	Kane & Lynch 2: Dog Days	Actor		
2010	Alpha Protocol	Konstantin Brayko		
2010	Dead to Rights: Retribution	Tseng		
2011	Final Fantasy XIII-2	Additional voices	English dub	
2011	The Elder Scrolls V: Skyrim	Additional voices		
2011	Uncharted 3: Drake's Deception	Pirate (Multiplayer)		
2011	Ace Combat: Assault Horizon	Tiger 1	English dub	
2011	Nicktoons MLB	Perch Perkins		
2011	Driver: San Francisco	Additional voices		
2011	Might & Magic Heroes VI	Changbo		
2012	Skylanders: Giants	Actor		
2012	XCOM: Enemy Unknown	Soldier		
2012	Resident Evil 6	Enemies		
2012	World of Warcraft: Mists of Pandaria	Pandaren Male Player Character		
2012	Diablo III	Additional voices		
2013	Lightning Returns: Final Fantasy XIII	Additional voices	English dub	
2013	Skylanders: Swap Force	Fright Rider		
2013	Teenage Mutant Ninja Turtles: Out of the Shadows	Shredder		
2013	Marvel Heroes	Human Torch, Deadpool		
2013	BioShock Infinite	Additional voices		
2014	Skylanders: Trap Team	Fright Rider, Molekin Miner Wispy, Kangarat 2		
2014	BioShock Infinite: Burial at Sea	Voice Acting Ensemble		
2014	Diablo III: Reaper of Souls	Additional voices		
2014	Hearthstone	Actor		
2015	Fallout 4	Justin Ayo, Male Raiders		
2015	Uncharted: The Nathan Drake Collection	Pirates	Archive sound	
2015	Skylanders: SuperChargers	Fright Rider		
2016	World of Warcraft: Legion	Master Windstrong, Cato, Margrave Dhakar		
2017	Agents of Mayhem	Agent Oni (Masamune Senichi)		
2017	Fortnite	Merry Munchkin Gingerbread Pet		
2017	Injustice 2	The Atom / Ryan Choi		
2018	World of Warcraft: Battle for Azeroth	Actor		
2019	Marvel Ultimate Alliance 3: The Black Order	Human Torch, Insectoids	Shadow of Doom DLC	
2019	Death Stranding	Thomas Southerland	Voice actor; motion capture by Edgar Wright	
2019	Judgment	Kazuya Ayabe	English dub	
2019–2020	Mortal Kombat 11	Liu Kang, Fujin	Also in Mortal Kombat 11 Ultimate	
2020	Cyberpunk 2077	Kerry Eurodyne	Credited as Matt Yang King	
2020	Ghost of Tsushima	Additional voices	English dub; Credited as Matt King	
2020	XCOM: Chimera Squad	Verge		
2020	Final Fantasy VII Remake	Additional voices	English dub; Credited as Matt Yang King	
2020	Warcraft III: Reforged	Illidan Stormrage	Named the #1 most iconic character Blizzard ever created by Comic Book Resources in 2018	
2021	Lost Judgment	Kazuki Soma	English dub; Credited as Matt Y. King	
2022	Call of Duty: Modern Warfare II	KorTac Group 1, Oroku "Shredder" Saki	Credited as Matt King	
2023	Mortal Kombat 1	Liu Kang, Akiro The Wizard		
2023	Mortal Kombat: Onslaught	Liu Kang, Fujin		
2023	Call of Duty: Modern Warfare III	Pham "Enigma" Lan Minh		
2023	The Walking Dead: Destinies	Glenn Rhee		
2023	Teenage Mutant Ninja Turtles: Splintered Fate	Oroku "Shredder" Saki		
2024	Like a Dragon: Infinite Wealth	Eric Tomizawa	English dub	
2025	Rosewater	Danny Luo, Apothecary		
2025	Dune Awakening	Petyr, Vitor Azat, Ugo Firenze		
2026	Teenage Mutant Ninja Turtles: Empire City	Oroku "Shredder" Saki		
2026	Yakuza Kiwami 3 & Dark Ties	Snake Flower Triad Boss		
2026	Dead by Daylight	Glenn Rhee		

=== Stage ===
Year	Title	Role	Company	Notes
1999–2000	Titanic: A New Musical	Quartermaster Robert Hichens, Bandsman Bricoux, 3rd Class Passenger	Original Broadway National Tour	
2000	2G's (The Two Gentlemen of Verona)	Company	Sacred Fools Theater Company	Winner of 2 NAACP awards, nominated for 7
2001	Yankee Dawg You Die	Bradley	East West Players	
2002	The Tempest	Caliban	East West Players	
2005	Ten Thousand Years	Yoshida	El Portal Forum Theatre	World premiere

== Awards and nominations ==
Year	Award/Organization	Award/Category	Work	Result	Notes
2007	Words From Here Short Script Competition	1st Place	The Harrowing	Won	With Peter Gamble Prize no longer awarded
2010	Scriptapalooza International Screenplay Competition		The Harrowing	Runner Up	With Peter Gamble
2011	Hollywood Foreign Press Association	Young Screenwriter's Award	The Harrowing	Won	With Peter Gamble
2011	CAPE (Coalition of Asian Pacifics in Entertainment) Digital Marketing Initiative	CAPE New Writer's Award	The Harrowing	Won	With Peter Gamble
2011	Behind the Voice Actors Awards	BTVA Television Voice Acting Award Best Vocal Ensemble in a Television Series	G.I. Joe: Renegades (2010)	Nominated	
2014	Steampunk Chronicle Readers Choice Awards	Best Steampunk Script	The Duelist	Won	
2016	Behind the Voice Actors Awards	BTVA Anime Dub Movie/Special Voice Acting Award Best Vocal Ensemble in an Anime Feature Film/Special	Only Yesterday (Omohide poro poro)	Nominated	
2017	Academy of Motion Picture Arts and Sciences	Academy Nicholl Fellowships in Screenwriting	DownTown	Semi-Finalist / Top 50	
2018	Academy of Motion Picture Arts and Sciences	Academy Nicholl Fellowships in Screenwriting	The Life and Death of Edison Chen	Semi-Finalist / Top 25	
