= The Sleeper (2000 film) =

- Genre: Crime drama
- Created by: Gillian White
- Written by: Gwyneth Hughes
- Directed by: Stuart Orme
- Starring: Eileen Atkins; Anna Massey; George Cole; Michelle Collins; Ciarán Hinds; Annabelle Apsion; Elizabeth Spriggs; Simon Chandler; Eric Byrne; Julia Deakin
- Composer: Colin Towns
- Country of origin: United Kingdom
- Original language: English
- No. of series: 1
- No. of episodes: 2

Production
- Executive producer: Pippa Harris
- Producer: Joy Spink
- Cinematography: Derek Suter
- Editor: Ardan Fisher
- Running time: 60 minutes
- Production company: BBC Worldwide

Original release
- Network: BBC1
- Release: 26 December – 27 December 2000

The Sleeper is a single British television crime drama film, written by Gwyneth Hughes and directed by Stuart Orme, that first broadcast on BBC1 on 26 December 2000. The film was initially broadcast in two parts, and is based on the novel by Gillian White.

The film was commissioned as part of the BBC's £42 million-pound Christmas schedule line-up for 2000. Neither part of the film attracted more than 6.4 million viewers, placing it outside of the Top 30 most watched programmes that week. Although the film remains unreleased on VHS or DVD, both parts are available to watch on YouTube.

== Plot ==
The Sleeper focuses on the Moon family, headed by Violet (Eileen Atkins), who descend into conflict when Fergus (Ciarán Hinds) and Claire (Annabelle Apsion), Violet's son and daughter-in-law, decide to sell the family farm from beneath her.

In Part One, as the family gather in the farmhouse to spend one last family Christmas together, a figure from Violet's past, determined to exact revenge, makes her way up to the farm amidst a rain and hail storm which cuts off power in the area, leaving the farm in pitch darkness.

In Part Two, suspicious are raised amongst the family when Cath goes missing, forcing Lillian and George to mount a search party. Claire also begins to suspect her mother's motives for bringing the family together.

== Cast ==
- Eileen Atkins as Violet Moon
- Anna Massey as Lillian Kessel
- George Cole as George Gleeson
- Michelle Collins as Diana Wakeham
- Ciarán Hinds as Fergus Moon
- Annabelle Apsion as Claire Moon
- Elizabeth Spriggs as Cath Marks
- Simon Chandler as Jonna Wakeham
- Eric Byrne as Sam Wakeham
- Julia Deakin as Valerie Fellgett
- Rupert Frazer as David Litton
- Christine Kavanagh as Sheena Marks
- Gerard Horan as Sergeant Pollard
- Simon Quarterman as PC Browning
- Jimmy Gardner as Ernest Page
- Andrea Lowe as Donna Dawes
- Sheila Reid as Mrs. Fitzhall
- Sophie Harmer as Young Kitty
- Hannah Powell as Young Violet
- Ian McNeice as Mr. Tarbuck

== See also ==
- The Sleeper
