= Ansei Toashi =

Japanese footrace in Annaka

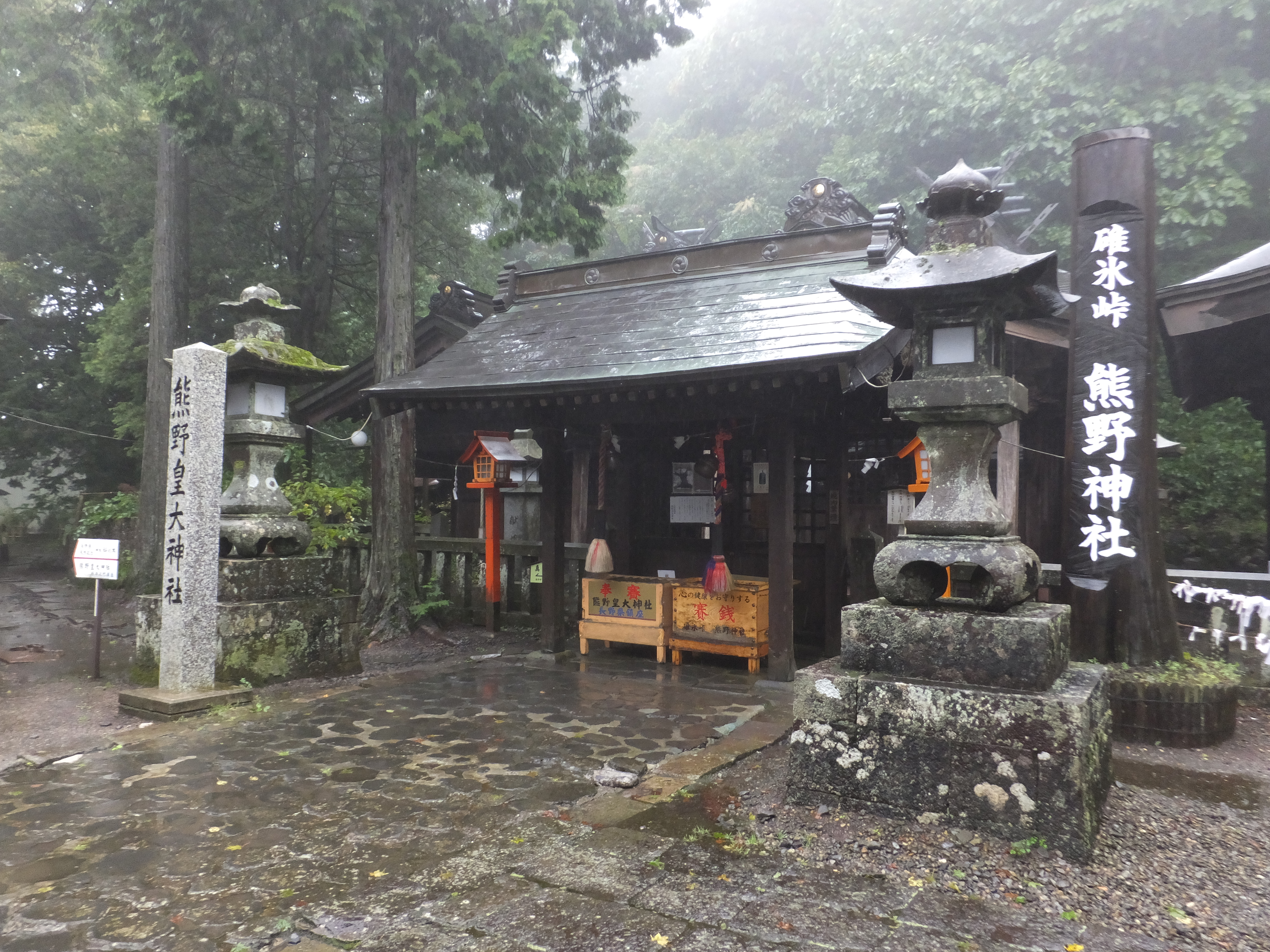
Kumano Gongen shrine at Usui Pass in 2016

Ansei Tōashi or Ansei-no-Tōashi was a footrace open to samurai of the Annaka Domain, of approximately 30 kilometers, during the Ansei era (1854–1860) of Japan. It has been nicknamed the "Samurai Marathon". Though forgotten for a long time, this event was re-instituted in 1955, and has been viewed as a cultural resource since then. Annaka City now holds a long-distance race annually in commemoration of Ansei Tōashi.

== Background ==
The place: the place was Annaka Domain, one of parts of Joshū which is modern Gunma Prefecture, which was situated in the north-west part of Kantō plain. Annaka Domain had a duty to defend Usui Pass, a narrow path, through which the transportation between Edo and north-western regions had to pass, therefore Annaka Domain was an important point of transport.

The time: the time was the spring of 1855, the second year of Ansei era, two years later from "Arrival of the Black Ships" incident. This incident created perturbation in Japan and a split of opinion for foreigners. Some feudal lords thought that strengthening and fortification were needed against for the invasion of Westerners, and Itakura Katsuakira, the lord of Annaka Domain, was one of them.

== Primary sources ==
Ansei Tōashi had been forgotten for long time until ancient manuscripts were found in 1955, from the underlining of fusuma of the house of shintō priest of Kumano Gongen shrine at Usui Pass. The manuscripts tells the story of Ansei Tōashi, and records its date, time and order of arrival.

The manuscripts comprises a rule book and a book that records the order of arrival. The manuscripts have been typed and studied by historians, and are preserved in the institute for the compilation of historical material of Annaka City.

== Event ==
On the basis of the primary sources, Itakura Katsuakira hoped his vassals would be strengthened, and ordered them to run from the castle gate to Kumano Gongen shrine at Usui Pass. He believed that it would benefit their mental and physical discipline.

The primary sources shows that the participants are 98 men, all the vassals of fifty years old and under. They were divided into dozens of groups, each group included 6 or 7 men. All member within a group started to run at the same time. The order of arrival of each groups were recorded. Tōashi event took place from May 19 to June 28 of Japan's lunisolar calendar in the second year of Ansei era.

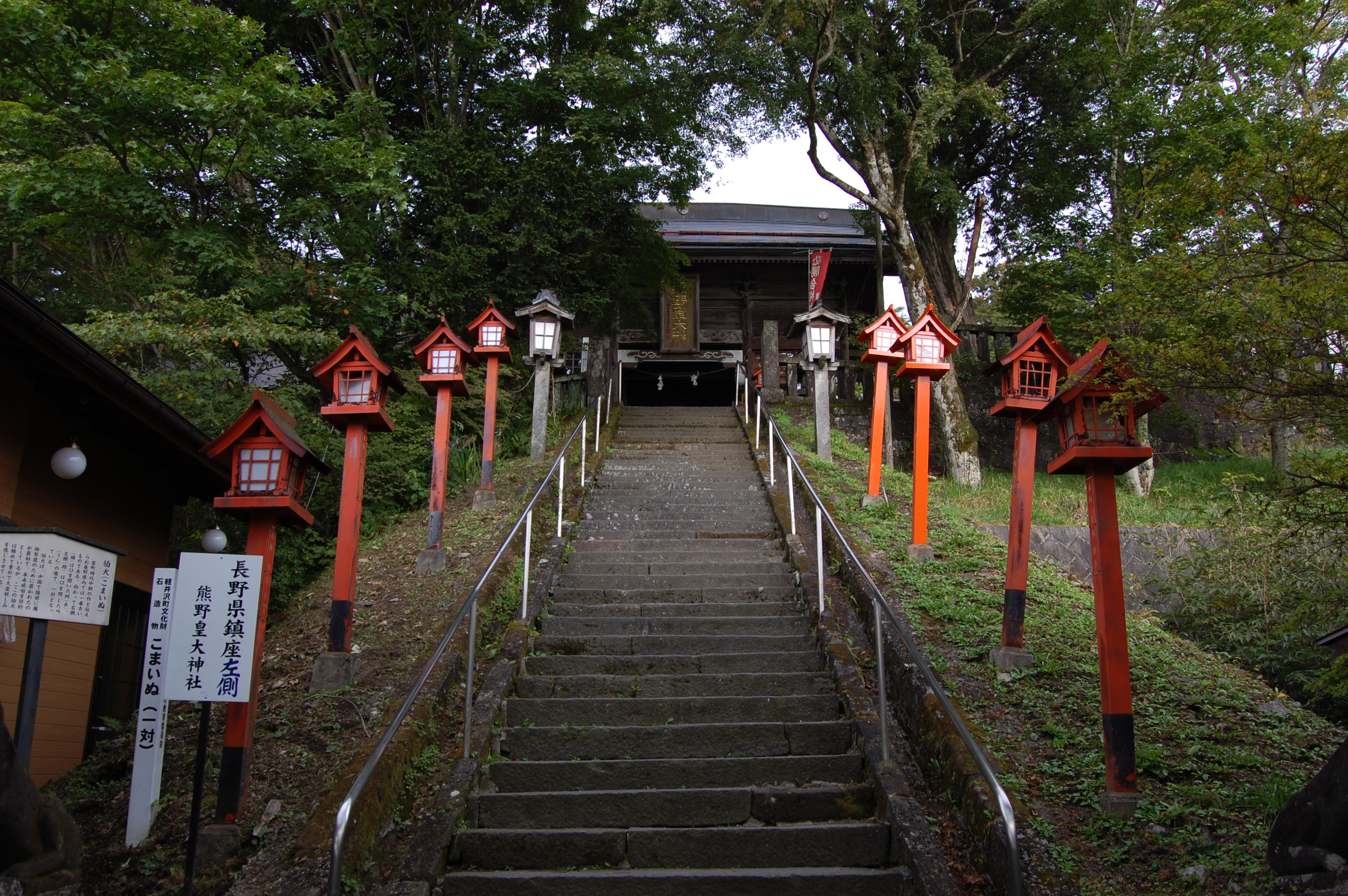
The final steps up to the shrine.

The route to run includes lots of ups and downs, and its length is 30 kilometer. The final stage of the route has a mountain path to Usui Pass.

The recorder was the shinō priest of Kumano Gongen shrine at Usui Pass. In the first day, the recorder was late for the estimated arrival time of samurais because he who took the designation as the recorder by Lord Itakura at the castle in the previous day had to put up at an inn due to rain in the foot of the mountain path. Therefore, he had to run and climb the mountain path along with them.

Samurai who arrived at the goal dedicated the early-ripening of rice plant to the deity of the shrine, and were given dried radish strips, seasoned cucumbers, rice cakes and tea. Itabashi 2017 assumes giving rice cakes have symbolic meaning that they provide strength to donatory. When the participants returns their home, it was not needed for them to run. However, they were not allowed to ride in sedan chair nor ride on horseback. They had to walk.

== Legacy ==
After discovering the primary sources, the event written in it came to be known, and the name Ansei Tōashi was coined. The historical fact that a kind of marathon, which was invented by baron de Coubertin for modern Olympics in 1908, was invented by one of Japanese feudal loads and actually held in 1855, was thought to be interesting for modern Japanese people.

Ansei Tōashi has been used as a cultural resource. Annaka City has annually held a "Samurai Marathon" and invited runners since 1975. Ansei Tōashi inspired some fictions. Marathon Samurai (1956), a film directed by Kazuo Mori, starring Shintaro Katsu, and Samurai Marathon 1855 (2019), a film directed by Bernard Rose are the films inspired by Ansei Tōashi.

== The Conductor ==
Itakura Katsuakira (1809-1857), the seventh head of the house of Itakura and the fifteenth ruler of Annaka Domain, was fond of studying and encouraged new industry in his domain. Stone inscriptions which are preserved in Annaka in modern days tell that Katsuakira encouraged farmers to plant Japanese lacquer trees, and, thanks to this, they and their offspring could and would be able to avoid from poverty.

An exemplary intellectual and political figure in Bakumatsu period, Katsuakira was anti-foreign and chauvinist, and took Japan's situation in global politics seriously. He felt menace about the situation that Westerners and Russians often came from overseas to Japan. According to Katsuakira's recognition of Japanese history, Japan had not been despised by oversea barbarians since the beginning of the country, and it was the enthusiasm for defence that kept this situation.

Under his reign, the Meiji-era educator Joseph Hardy Neesima was born as the son of a retainer of the domain. Hearing young Neesima's talent, Katsuakira ordered him to take up Dutch studies at his age of 14. Neeshima's grandfather was formerly Shugen mystic, and, being expected to utilize his knowledge by the ruler of those days Katsunao, later became a lower-ranked feudal retainer of Annaka Domain.

== See also ==
- Fukoku kyōhei
- Mitogaku
