= CQV =

CQV can refer to:

- Cat Que Virus, a type of virus spread by Culex mosquitoes in China
- Celui qui vit, meaning the person insured in life insurance
- COVID-19 Quarantine Victoria, an organization that handles the COVID-19 pandemic in Victoria, Australia
- CareGroup Center for Quality and Value, a data analysis firm that formerly hired John Halamka
