= Friendship's Field =

- Directed by: Bruce Neibaur
- Written by: Bruce Neibaur
- Produced by: Rick B. Larsen & Jeff T. Miller
- Starring: Kate Maberly; Jonathan Hernandez; Randall King; Nancy Riddle
- Cinematography: Matthew Wiliams
- Music by: Sam Cardon
- Distributed by: Feature Films for Families
- Release date: 1995
- Running time: 84 minutes
- Language: English

Friendship's Field is a 1995 drama film about overcoming prejudice.

Parts of the film were shot in Salt Lake City, Utah and Idaho.

== Plot ==
Ira has one last summer of freedom before having to work in the beet fields with her sisters. Her father hires some migrant workers, and Ira makes friend with Oscar, a Mexican. Despite prejudice of locals, the two build a lasting friendship.

== Primary cast ==
- Kate Maberly as Ira
- Jonathan Hernandez as Oscar
- Randall King as George
- Nancy Riddle as Older Ira
