= Playoff (disambiguation) =

The playoffs are the post-season matches (usually to decide a championship) in various sports leagues.

Playoff, play-off or playoffs may also refer to:

- One-game playoff, a single ad hoc tiebreaker match
- Playoff (golf), extra hole(s) played to break a tie
- Third place playoff, between losing semi-finalists in a knockout tournament
  - Playoff Bowl, 1960s NFL third place playoff
- Football League play-offs, the post-season matches to decide promotion to the next division
- Playoff (film), a 2011 film
- "Playoffs?", a well-known postgame rant delivered by former NFL head coach Jim E. Mora

== See also ==
- tiebreaker
