= Doctor Who Am I =

- Directed by: Vanessa Yuille; Matthew Jacobs
- Produced by: Vanessa Yuille; Matthew Jacobs; Carol-Jeanette Jorgensen; Maria Marchetti; Colin Vaines
- Starring: Daphne Ashbrook; Nicholas Briggs; May Charters; Ken Deep; Cat Hyaesia; Paul Booth
- Cinematography: Dylan Glockler
- Edited by: Vanessa Yuille
- Music by: Mark Leggett
- Release date: 2022
- Running time: 80 minutes
- Country: United Kingdom
- Language: English

Doctor Who Am I is a 2022 American documentary film about the legacy of the 1996 Doctor Who TV movie, its writer, Matthew Jacobs, and the American Doctor Who fandom. Vanessa Yuille and Jacobs directed and produced the documentary, and Daphne Ashbrook, Nicholas Briggs, Paul McGann, Eric Roberts, Paul Booth, May Charters, Ken Deep and Cat Hyaesia starred in it. The film was released through Kaleidoscope Film Distribution in select UK cinemas on 27 October 2022, followed by a home media release on 28 November.

== Production ==
The film project originated during the fiftieth anniversary of Doctor Who, nine years before the documentary's release, when interest in Jacobs spiked. Though he had "distanced [him]self from the fans", Yuille contacted him about creating the film. Jacobs initially believed the film would be mostly about the fans of Doctor Who, though Yuille "always knew it was going to be about him.”

== Cast ==
- Daphne Ashbrook
- Nicholas Briggs
- May Charters
- Ken Deep
- Cat Hyaesia
- Matthew Jacobs
- Paul McGann
- Eliza Roberts
- Eric Roberts
- Paul Salamoff
- Philip David Segal
- Vanessa Yuille
- Paul Booth

== Release ==
The documentary premiered at the Sci-Fi-London film festival in May of 2022.

Kaleidoscope Film Distribution bought the rights to distribute the film in August 2022. Yuille said of the deal that "teaming up with Kaleidoscope is a perfect match for us because even though we're an American movie, they understand the Doctor Who franchise and the global reach of the fandom."

The film was originally slated for release in selected UK cinemas on 13 October 2022. However, this was delayed until 27 October, and the home media (DVD & Blu-ray) release was also moved from 7 to 28 November the same year.

== Reception ==
Reviews for the film were mostly positive, with some exceptions. Leslie Felperin, writing for The Guardian, gave the film three stars out of five, stating that it "never quite wraps its arms around the whole phenomenon" of why Doctor Who meant so much to the fans, and that it was "very skewed towards the costume-wearing US end of Whovian fandom". British science fiction magazine Starburst gave it five stars, calling it "emotional" and "thought-provoking". Radio Times rated it five stars also, noting the "touching humility to how Jacobs carries himself" and that its story was "both remarkably specific and yet universally understood". That's Pop Culture rated the documentary five stars, saying it was "filled with more heart than a Time Lord".

== Soundtrack release ==
Mark Leggett's score was released to digital platforms 7 October 2022.
