= Lear Rex =

- Directed by: Bernard Rose
- Screenplay by: Bernard Rose
- Based on: King Lear by William Shakespeare
- Produced by: Barry Navidi; Mattias Westman
- Starring: Al Pacino; Jessica Chastain; Ariana DeBose; Rachel Brosnahan; LaKeith Stanfield; Peter Dinklage; Chris Messina; Ted Levine; Danny Huston; Matthew Jacobs; Rhys Coiro; Stephen Dorff
- Cinematography: Takurô Ishizaka
- Edited by: Victor Du Bois
- Production companies: Dali Films; Eco Entertainment; Westman Films; World Vision
- Country: United States
- Language: English

Lear Rex is an upcoming American drama film written and directed by Bernard Rose. It is an adaptation of William Shakespeare's King Lear.

== Cast ==
- Al Pacino as Rey Lear
- Jessica Chastain as Goneril
- Ariana DeBose as Cordelia
- Rachel Brosnahan as Regan
- LaKeith Stanfield as Edmund
- Peter Dinklage as The Fool
- Chris Messina as Duke of Cornwall
- Ted Levine as Earl of Kent
- Danny Huston as Duke of Albany
- Matthew Jacobs as Earl of Gloucester
- Rhys Coiro as Oswald
- Stephen Dorff as Poor Tom
- Happy Anderson as The Captain
- Damon Gupton as Curran

== Production ==
Al Pacino revealed in April 2023 he was developing a new adaptation of King Lear. The adaptation would be confirmed in February 2024, with Bernard Rose set to write and direct, and Pacino cast to star as Lear, with Jessica Chastain cast as Goneril. In August, Ariana DeBose, Rachel Brosnahan, LaKeith Stanfield, and Peter Dinklage were among several new cast additions announced. Principal photography began on August 12, 2024, in Los Angeles and wrapped on October 19, 2024.
