= Mothertime =

- Directed by: Matthew Jacobs
- Written by: Novel: Gillian White
- Produced by: Josh Golding
- Starring: Kate Maberly; Gina McKee; Anthony Andrews; Imogen Stubbs; Sheila Allen; Zohren Weiss; Felix Bell; Rosalind Bennett; Faith Brook; Megan De Wolf; Stephanie Fayerman
- Cinematography: Peter Hannan
- Edited by: Rodney Holland; Pamela Power
- Music by: John Harle
- Distributed by: BBC Films
- Release dates: 28 December 1997 (UK); 1 January 1998 (U.S.)
- Running time: 87 minutes
- Country: United Kingdom
- Language: English

Mothertime is a 1997 British film directed by Matthew Jacobs.

== Plot ==
Vanessa and her siblings watch, as their divorced mother once again becomes drunk, making the children believe their Christmas will be ruined once again. Some drastic changes must be taken. When their mother is drunk, they take her and lock her in a basement to dry out. So begins a conspiracy to hide her absence from their father and the cleaning lady. The children feed their mother and spend many hours in the basement with her, hence the title Mothertime. The children also spend time with their beloved father and his new wife hoping to spring a new but long lost family whole again. Unfortunately, the manoeuvres are not so easy.

== Cast ==
- Kate Maberly as Vanessa
- Gina McKee as Caroline
- Anthony Andrews as Robin
- Imogen Stubbs as Suzie
- Sheila Allen as Eileen
- Felix Bell as Lot
- Rosalind Bennett as Ruby
- Faith Brook as Isobel
- Megan De Wolf as Sacha
- Rosy De Wolf as Amber
- Kevin Dyer as Park Supervisor
- Stephanie Fayerman as Mrs. Guerney
- Georgie Glen as Sister Louise
- Germaine Greer as Herself
- Sara-Marie Maltha as Ilse
- Ghizela Modood as Radio Presenter
- Ian Reddington as Bart
- Fenella Shepard as Assistant
- Zohren Weiss as Dominic

== Awards ==
- Won a Gold Award for Theatrical Feature at WorldFest-Flagstaff.
