= Frankenstein (2015 film) =

- Theatrical poster
- Directed by: Bernard Rose
- Written by: Bernard Rose
- Based on: Frankenstein; or, The Modern Prometheus; 1818 novel by Mary Shelley
- Produced by: Christian Angermayer; Gabriela Bacher; Klemens Hallmann; Jennifer Holliday Morrison
- Starring: Xavier Samuel; Carrie-Anne Moss; Tony Todd; Maya Erskine; Danny Huston
- Cinematography: Candace Higgins
- Music by: Halli Cauthery
- Production companies: Bad Badger; Summerstorm Entertainment; Eclectic Pictures
- Distributed by: Alchemy
- Release dates: April 12, 2015 (Brussels International Fantastic Film Festival); September 21, 2015
- Running time: 89 minutes
- Country: United States
- Language: English

Frankenstein is a 2015 American science fiction horror film written and directed by Bernard Rose. It is a modernized adaptation of Mary Shelley's 1818 novel Frankenstein; or, The Modern Prometheus. The film is told from the monster's point of view, as he is created, escapes into the modern world, and learns about the dark side of humanity.

== Plot ==
Victor Frankenstein and his wife, Elizabeth, are scientists who bring to life Adam, a fully-grown, handsome young man with the mind of an infant. Adam's cells fail to replicate correctly, and he soon develops deformities on his face and body. Dr. Frankenstein attempts to euthanize his creation with lethal injections, but Adam thrashes and screams as the chemicals surge through his body. Victor then chokes him. Later, two scientists attempt to dissect an apparently dead Adam, but he regains consciousness and kills both scientists.

Adam escapes into a nearby forest and lives by scavenging. He adopts a friendly stray dog with which he travels to the city. In a park, he meets Molly, a little girl, and they play a game of throwing sticks into a lake. Adam, still thinking that it is a game, picks up Molly and throws her into the water, as well. She starts to drown, so he jumps in and saves her. When he brings her to shore, however, two policemen try to arrest him and shoot his barking dog to death. Adam assaults one officer and kills the other for killing his dog. A vigilante mob then chases Adam down while calling him a monster.

Adam is taken to a police station, where he is put into a straitjacket. When officers ask his name, Adam replies with "Monster", using the name the mob used for him, the same name he would use for himself in all social interactions. Almost completely nonverbal, he gives them Elizabeth's identification badge and calls her his mom. Elizabeth is brought to the station and denies knowing Adam, effectively abandoning him.

Two vengeful policemen drive Adam to an empty lot, beat him, and shoot him in the head, but he survives, awakens hours later, and wanders until he meets Eddie, a blind, homeless man. Recognizing a childlike soul, Eddie kindly takes Adam under his wing. Adam's deformities worsen, but he continues to learn about the world and his ability to speak improves.

Sometime later, Eddie convinces a friendly prostitute named Wanda to take Adam to a hotel to have sex with him, but Wanda insists that he shower first. After he emerges from the shower, Wanda realizes how extensive his deformities are, so tries to leave. Distraught, Adam snaps her spine while trying to prevent her from leaving. Eddie, having heard Wanda's screams, enters the room and discovers that she is dead. He then angrily beats Adam with his cane. Adam ends up accidentally killing Eddie, as well.

Feeling hopeless and angry, he uses the GPS on Wanda's phone to guide him to the Frankensteins' residence. While walking along a highway, Adam encounters two police officers, one of them being Officer Banks, the same officer who shot him in the head several days earlier. The officers order Adam to stop. Instead, Adam grabs Banks' gun and shoots his partner. Banks and Adam recognize each other and Adam shoots Banks in the head.

Adam encounters the Frankensteins after arriving at their luxurious home. Adam attacks Victor, but Elizabeth calms him down. They show Adam his true origins and tell him that they named him Adam. He is angry to learn that he was created by the Frankensteins and that Victor was already attempting to replace him with another artificially created human. While Adam is distracted, Victor knocks him down and injects him with a sedative. Victor then attempts to decapitate him with a surgical handsaw while he is unconscious. Elizabeth tries to stop Victor by hitting him with a metal tray. Victor then swings the saw at her and accidentally slices her neck open. Victor flees and Elizabeth quickly bleeds to death.

Adam takes Elizabeth's body into the nearby woods. He solemnly builds a large fire which he uses to immolate both Elizabeth and himself. While engulfed in flames, he cries, "I am Adam!"

== Cast ==
- Xavier Samuel as Adam
- Carrie-Anne Moss as Elizabeth Frankenstein
- Danny Huston as Victor Frankenstein
- Tony Todd as Eddie
- Maya Erskine as Wanda
- Mckenna Grace as Molly
- David Pressler as Dr. Pretorius
- Matthew Jacobs as Dr. Marcus
- Jeff Hilliard as Officer Banks
- Jorge Luis Pallo as Officer Lincoln
- Ron Roggé as Officer Woodcrock
- Rob Mars as Officer Crawford
- Mary Gallagher as Amy Johnson
- John Lacy as Mark Ruby
- Jeordie Osbourne White as Skid Row Man

== Release ==
The film premiered April 12, 2015, at the Brussels International Fantastic Film Festival, followed by the Louisiana International Film Festival on May 9, 2015. The film was released on home video on February 23, 2016.

== Reception ==
Rotten Tomatoes has the film at 100%, based on 9 reviews. Pat Torfe for Bloody Disgusting said "A strong central performance by Samuel, with some great modern reimaginings of scenes from the novel that perfectly mirror the original story, make for an emotional and dramatic horror tale." Louis H.C., also writing for Bloody Disgusting, said of the film, "Rarely have we seen the Modern Prometheus translated so earnestly on the big screen" and "If you're a fan of the original story or just in the mood for some stellar storytelling, give this one a shot." Gareth Jones, writing for Dread Central, gave the film four and a half stars, writing, "Melodramatic at turns, Bernard Rose's Frankenstein is nonetheless a remarkably affecting piece of filmmaking sporting some wince-inducing gore and extreme violence."
