= Kate Maberly =

British actress, director, writer, producer, and musician

- Born: Kate Elizabeth Cameron Maberly; 14 March 1982 (age 44); Reigate, Surrey, England
- Education: Trinity Laban Conservatoire of Music and Dance
- Occupations: Actor; writer; director; musician; producer; composer; singer
- Years active: 1991–present
- Relatives: Polly Maberly (sister)

Kate Elizabeth Cameron Maberly (/ˈmeɪbərli/ MAY-bər-lee; born 14 March 1982) is an English actress, director, writer, producer, and musician. She has appeared in film, television, radio, and theatre.

== Early life ==
Maberly was born in Reigate, Surrey, England. She is the daughter of a lawyer, and is one of five children; she has a younger brother, two older brothers, and her older sister Polly Maberly is also an actress. Maberly attended Dunottar School, Reigate, where she skipped ahead a year and left with A-levels in maths, chemistry, history, and music.

Maberly began swimming competitively at the age of five, and she was a county champion swimmer up to the age of 16. At seven years old, she completed the BT National Swimathon (as the youngest individual to complete the event at the time) to raise money for St Piers Lingfield (Now "Young Epilepsy"), a school to help children with epilepsy. She represented her county in tennis from the age of 12, and from 2004–2010 she played for the Royal Parks tennis leagues in London.

She started playing the piano at the age of six, and at 14 travelled to Venice with the Dunottar Chamber Ensemble to perform as the solo pianist in a performance of Mozart's Piano Concerto no. 23 (K488). She achieved grade eight in both piano and cello in school and went on to study at London's Trinity College of Music, graduating in 2004 with a joint honours degree in piano and cello performance. She also composes music and sings jazz, and has sung at London jazz venue 'Pizza on the Park'.

== Career ==
Maberly's breakthrough role came in 1993 when she starred as Mary Lennox in the feature film The Secret Garden. Directed by Agnieszka Holland, the film achieved international acclaim and has gone on to become a family classic. This internationally acclaimed performance paved the way for several subsequent lead roles, including Dinah Bellman in The Langoliers, Glumdalclitch in Gulliver's Travels, Ira in Friendship's Field, and Vanessa in Mothertime.

Back in the UK, Maberly continued to work on various high-caliber period dramas for the BBC, including the Bafta-winning "Anglo-Saxon Attitudes" with Kate Winslet and Daniel Craig; the Bafta/Golden Globe-winning "The Last of the Blond Bombshells" with Dame Judi Dench and Ian Holm; the Emmy-winning Victoria & Albert, the Bafta-winning Daniel Deronda (directed by Tom Hooper) and Finding Neverland. She took to the stage as Juliet in Shakespeare's Romeo and Juliet, then as Mathilde in Christopher Hampton's Total Eclipse at the Royal Court Theatre in London. Since graduating, she has appeared in such feature films as Like Minds, Popcorn, Rites of Passage and Standing Up, as well as the HULU/FX's The Booth at the End.

She has performed voiceovers for Ordynek, Bringing the Pride of Poland to Texas in 2000 and The Braniff Pages in 2001. She has completed several radio works for BBC Radio 4, including The Dorabella Variation, A Certain Smile, and National Velvet. Maberly's narration of the audiobook Catherine, Called Birdy, written by Karen Cushman, received an Audie Award in 1995. In 2007, Maberly teamed up with a London-area music producer to record several of her own songs for a new mini album. Maberly demonstrated her musical abilities by playing the piano in the 1995 BBC drama Mothertime and the cello in the 2004 short film The Audition. She also produced and directed a music video for Danish rock band Blooq a.k.a. Triggerbox.

In 2015, Maberly wrote, directed, and produced a short film, Charlie's Supersonic Glider, which opened the Hollywood Film Festival. With producing partner Doug Liman, Maberly is writing, producing, and directing The Forest of Hands and Teeth, adapted from the best-selling Young Adult series by Carrie Ryan.

Maberly was named one of Variety's "10 Brits to Watch in 2017".

== Filmography ==
=== Film ===
Year	Title	Role	Notes
1993	The Secret Garden	Mary Lennox	Also performed "Mistress Mary Quite Contrary"
1995	Friendship's Field	Ira	
1998	Mysteries of Egypt	Granddaughter	Short film
1999	Gooseberries Don't Dance		Short film
2002	Deserter	Jennifer	
2004	The Audition	Lucy Carrington	Short film; also played the cello
2004	Finding Neverland	Wendy Darling	
2006	Like Minds / Murderous Intent	Susan Mueller	
2007	Popcorn	Annie	
2008	Boogeyman 3	Jennifer	
2011	In the Eyes	Jessica	Short film
2012	Rites of Passage	Dani	
2012	The Ghastly Love of Johnny X	Dandi Conners	Also performed "Here We Go!"
2013	Standing Up	Margo Cutter	
2015	Charlie's Supersonic Glider		Short film; director, writer, and producer only
2023	1066	Eadgyth Godwinson	

=== Television ===
Year	Title	Role	Notes
1991	Screen One	Christine	"Ex"
1992	Anglo Saxon Attitudes	Young Kay	TV miniseries
1995	The Langoliers	Dinah Bellman	TV miniseries
1996	Gulliver's Travels	Glumdalclitch	TV miniseries
1997	Gobble	Pippa Worsfold	TV film
1997	Screen Two	Vanessa	"Mothertime"
2000	The Last of the Blonde Bombshells	Young Madeleine	TV film
2001	Victoria & Albert	Princess Alice	TV film
2001	Midsomer Murders	Holly Reid	"Dark Autumn"
2002	A Touch of Frost	Melanie Monkton	"Mistaken Identity: Parts 1 & 2"
2002	Daniel Deronda	Kate Meyrick	TV miniseries
2010	The Booth at the End	Jenny	Recurring role

=== Theatre ===
- A reading of Christopher Hampton's Total Eclipse (directed by Daniel Evans) at the Royal Court Theatre (2006)
- Juliet in William Shakespeare's Romeo and Juliet (directed by Richard Twyman) with Midas Touch Theatre Company

== Discography ==
=== Collaborations ===
Year	Information	Tracks contributed	Artist(s)
1993	The Secret Garden: Artist: Various	Mistress Mary Lennox (unlisted)	Andrew Knott
2012	The Ghastly Love of Johnny X: Artist: Various; Released: 20 November	21. "Here We Go"	Will Keenan, De Anna Joy Brooks, Reggie Bannister, Heather R. Provost (as Heather Provost), Les Williams, Sara Grigsby, Rebecca Burchett, Morris Everett, David Slaughter

=== Radio ===
- The Shoemaker's Daughter
- The Dora Bella Variation
- Little Women
- Walls of Silence
- National Velvet
- A Certain Smile
- My Wounded Heart
- Peter Pan in Scarlet
- The Browning Version

== Other ==
- Catherine, Called Birdy (audiobook narrator)
- Braniff International Airways promotion for "The Braniff Pages" – braniffpages.com (commercial voiceover)
- A voiceover for horse documentary The Origins of the Arabian
- Ordynek, Bringing The Pride of Poland to Texas (commercial voiceover, 2000)

== Publications ==
- Article Factory Magazine (USA) April 2007, Iss. Spring, pg. 54–62, "British Young Guns"
- Pictorial Factory Magazine (USA) April 2007, Iss. Spring, pg. 54–64, "British Young Guns"
- Variety (USA) February 2017, Iss. Winter "10 Brits to Watch in 2017"

== Awards ==
Maberly has won two professional awards:

- Audie Award for Catherine, Called Birdy
- Special Award from London Film Critics Circle for The Secret Garden.
