= The Kreutzer Sonata (2008 film) =

2008 film by Bernard Rose

- Directed by: Bernard Rose
- Written by: Lisa Enos; Bernard Rose
- Based on: The Kreutzer Sonata by: Leo Tolstoy
- Starring: Danny Huston; Elisabeth Röhm; Matthew Yang King; Anjelica Huston
- Distributed by: Axiom Films (UK and Ireland)
- Release date: 20 June 2008 (Edinburgh International Film Festival)
- Running time: 99 minutes
- Country: United States
- Language: English

The Kreutzer Sonata is a 2008 film co-written and directed by Bernard Rose based on the 1889 novella by Leo Tolstoy, starring Danny Huston, Elisabeth Röhm, Matthew Yang King and Anjelica Huston.

It is the second time Danny Huston has led a film directed by Rose (after Ivans XTC) and Rose's third adaptation of a work by Tolstoy, following 1997's Anna Karenina and 2003's Ivans XTC.

"The Kreutzer Sonata" is the name commonly given to Ludwig van Beethoven's Violin Sonata no. 9 in A major. Director Bernard Rose had previously directed Immortal Beloved, a film about the life of Beethoven, in which there is a major (and pivotal) scene that features a performance of Beethoven's Kreutzer Sonata.
