= Playoff (film) =

Playoff פלייאוף
- Directed by: Eran Riklis
- Written by: David Akerman; Gidon Maron; Eran Riklis
- Produced by: Olivier Delbosc; Udo Happel; Marc Missonnier; Moshe Edri; Leon Edri; Michael Sharfstein; Marc Wächter
- Starring: Danny Huston; Stephan Beck; Hanns Zischler; Max Riemelt
- Cinematography: Rainer Klausmann
- Production companies: TLV Art Rabinovich Fund; Partner
- Distributed by: HOT; Channel 10; Tofia Communications
- Release date: November 24, 2011 (Israel)
- Running time: 107 minutes
- Countries: Israel; Germany; France
- Languages: German; English; Hebrew
- Budget: $25 million

Playoff (Hebrew: פלייאוף) is a 2011 biographical film, written and directed by Israeli director, Eran Riklis. The film is inspired by the life of Ralph Klein, Israel's most famous basketball coach.

== Plot ==
The film tells the story of legendary Israeli basketball coach Max Stoller. He became a national hero, when he made Maccabi Tel Aviv into European Champions in the late Seventies, one of Israel's first great international sporting successes. But Max became a national traitor equally fast, when he then accepted the against-all-odds job of turning the totally hopeless West-German basketball team into European winners.

Max always maintains that Germany - where he was born before the war - means nothing to him, and that training their national team is just another job on his path to NBA glory. But things aren't as simple as he refuses to speak German to the young players. The only person he seems to be able to relate to is a Turkish immigrant woman Deniz, and her cheeky teenage daughter Sema. Max just about falls in love with Deniz - and does succeed in reinventing the Germans as European champions. When he discovers what happened to his own family in the 1940s - it is not what he had expected. And he will realize that one cannot run away forever from one's own past and demons.

== Cast ==
- Danny Huston as Ralph Klein (Max Stoller)
- Amira Casar as Deniz
- Mark Waschke as Axel
- Max Riemelt as Thomas
- Hanns Zischler as Franz
- Selen Savas as Sema
- Smadi Wolfman as Ronit (Smadar Wolfman)
- Andreas Eufinger as Ulrich
- Mathias von Heydebrand as Dieter
- Irm Hermann as Bertha
- Yehuda Almagor as Shimi
- Volker Metzker - Reporter Taxi
- Verena Wüstkamp as Reporter - VIP Room
- Oliver Klös - Cameraman
- Steffen Müller - Reporter VIP
- Peter Steitz - Border Police Man
- Arne Habeck - Policeman
- Michael Benthin as Chestnutseller
- Thomas Lehmann - Policeman
- Janine Bernstein - Woman Night Club
- Momo (Peter W.) Schmitz as Clerk
- Susanne Tischler - Saleswoman Watchstore
- Andreas Dobberkau - Driver
- Karl Jürgen Sihler - Reporter VIP
