= The Sleeper (2012 film) =

- Limited Edition DVD/VHS box set released by Gamma Knife Films
- Directed by: Justin Russell
- Written by: Justin Russell
- Produced by: Justin Russell; Dana Jackson
- Starring: Ali Ferda; Paul Moon; Eric Sarich; Beverly Kristy; Brittany Belland; E. Ray Goodwin; Jason Jay Crabtree
- Cinematography: Justin Russell
- Edited by: Justin Russell
- Music by: Gremlin
- Production company: Gamma Knife Films
- Distributed by: Gamma Knife Films
- Release date: January 31, 2012
- Running time: 90 minutes
- Country: United States
- Language: English

The Sleeper is a 2012 American slasher film written and directed by Justin Russell.

== Plot ==
In 1979, a giggling man with milky white eyes (credited as "The Sleeper") breaks into a bedroom in the Alpha Gamma Theta sorority house in the middle of the night, killing a resident with a hammer. Two years later, the sorority is organizing a party to welcome new pledges, an event that prompts the return of the Sleeper, who has been living on the campus in secret, spying on the Alpha Gamma Thetas, and threatening them over the phone.

On the day of the party, the Sleeper sneaks into the sorority, kills Cindy by bashing her face in with a hammer, and hides her body. By the next day, the sorority members find Cindy missing and so does Bobby. Later that night the Sleeper strikes again, ripping Rebecca's face off using the claw of his hammer in a gym's locker room. He then moves on to killing Stacy, her suitor Derek, and an employee at a pool hall. As these homicides occur, Cindy's boyfriend Bobby goes to the police to report Cindy's disappearance, and he and Detective Drake learn that Rebecca and Stacy have gone missing after the detective calls the sorority. Drake sends Bobby home, and goes to the sorority while the Sleeper kills Matt, a boy who had walked Alpha Gamma Theta pledge Amy to her dormitory.

Amy discovers she has been left a message by the Sleeper just before Drake calls to ask her if she has seen any of the missing students. Drake advises Amy to come to the Alpha Gamma Theta house (where they are setting up a phone tap) when she tells him about the message she had received. The Sleeper's calls are traced to an old storm cellar in Jacob's Hall, so Drake heads there. Two officers are left to watch the house, but the Sleeper manages to get inside, and kills everyone in the building (including Bobby when he drops by) besides Amy. The Sleeper wounds Drake when he returns, chases Amy through the campus, and to his lair, where Amy stabs him.

Amy is found by a patrolling officer, and taken to a hospital, where she is informed by a doctor that Drake is in the ICU, and the Sleeper was caught. As she tries to rest, Amy is bothered but then answers a nearby ringing phone and screams when she realizes that the killer is on the line.

== Cast ==
- Brittany Belland as Amy
- E. Ray Goodwin as Detective Drake
- Jason Jay Crabtree as The Sleeper
- Elizabeth Lane as June
- Jenna Fournier as Laura
- Riana Ballo as Stacy
- Jessica Cameron as Cindy
- Tiffany Arnold as Rebecca
- Ali Ferda as Ava
- Kendra Stevenson as First Sister
- Beverly Kristy as Miss Joy
- Paul Moon as Bobby
- Eric Sarich as Derek
- Aaron Russell as Matt Matheson
- Joe Bob Briggs as Dr Briggs

== Production ==
The Sleeper was filmed in Springfield, Ohio over thirteen days in February 2011.

== Release ==
The Sleeper was released on DVD, video-on-demand, and a combination DVD and VHS pack on January 31, 2012.

== Reception ==
Steve Barton of Dread Central gave The Sleeper a four out of five, and stated that it "stands as the best homage to early eighties filmmaking since Ti West's amazing The House of the Devil". The film also made it as an honorable mention on one of the website's "Best of 2012" lists, where Matt Serafini wrote "it gets everything right: the pacing, the atmosphere, the settings... Russell nails it. Here's a guy who understands the slasher film, and I look forward to his next outing as a result".

The attempt to recreate an eighties atmosphere was criticized by Film Bizarro's Preston Carnell, who felt the film was trying so hard in that department that it became annoying and distracting. Other than that, Carnell gave The Sleeper a positive review, stating it had good atmosphere, cinematography, and death scenes, and passable acting. David Andreas of Splatter Critic reacted negatively to The Sleeper, giving it a 1½ out of 4, and writing that it "tries to come off as a throwback to '80s slashers, but mostly duplicates the faults that ruin films of any decade. Poorly acted, completely illogical, and with the worst line dancing since Howling: New Moon Rising.

== See also ==
- The Sleeper (2000 film)
