= Traveling Light (2021 film) =

- Release poster
- Directed by: Bernard Rose
- Written by: Bernard Rose
- Produced by: Bernard Rose
- Starring: Danny Huston; Tony Todd; Stephen Dorff; Olivia d'Abo
- Cinematography: Bernard Rose Rousselot
- Edited by: Misha Aranyshev
- Music by: Ivo Dimchev; Ruby Rose
- Distributed by: Xenon Pictures
- Release date: October 10, 2021 (Beyond Fest)
- Running time: 90 minutes
- Country: United States
- Language: English

Traveling Light is a 2021 American drama film written and directed by Bernard Rose and starring Danny Huston, Tony Todd, Stephen Dorff, and Olivia d'Abo.

== Cast ==
- Tony Todd as Caddy
- Danny Huston as Harry
- Stephen Dorff as Todd
- Matthew Jacobs as Arthur
- Olivia d'Abo
- Duke Nicholson as Sydney
- Jeff Hilliard as Blaster

== Release ==
The film premiered at Beyond Fest on Sunday, October 10, 2021. It was later released in New York City and Seattle on August 19, 2022.

== Reception ==
The film has a 60% rating on Rotten Tomatoes based on five reviews.

Rene Rodriguez of Variety gave the film a negative review, calling it "an experimental attempt at social commentary that fails to provide any insight, emotion or even entertainment of the most basic kind."

Annie Flores of The Austin Chronicle awarded the film three and a half stars out of five and wrote, "The film successfully evokes all the hair-raising tension of a time not too far behind us, and creates a commentary on class, race, and societal values that continue to resonate nearly three years on."

Bilge Ebiri of Vulture gave the film a positive review and wrote that it "continues Rose’s ongoing efforts to create haunting miniatures about life in Los Angeles with a classical twist."
