= Personal Genome Project =

Cohort study sequencing genomes of 100,000 volunteers

The Personal Genome Project (PGP) is a long term, large cohort study which aims to sequence and publicize the complete genomes and medical records of 100,000 volunteers, in order to enable research into personal genomics and personalized medicine. It was initiated by Harvard University's George M. Church in 2005. As of November 2017, more than 10,000 volunteers had joined the project. Volunteers were accepted initially if they were permanent residents of the US and were able to submit tissue and/or genetic samples. Later the project was expanded to other countries.

== Study ==
The Project was initially launched in the US in 2005 and later extended to Canada (2012), United Kingdom (2013), Austria (2014), Korea (2015) and China (2017).

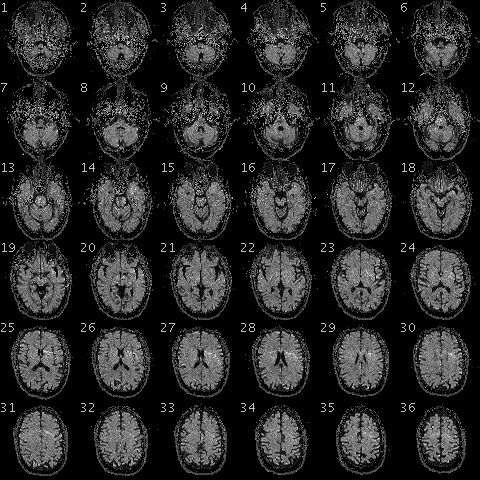
fMRI of the head of a 58 yr old male participant in the project.

The project allowed participants to publish the genotype (the full DNA sequence of all 46 chromosomes) of the volunteers, along with extensive information about their phenotype: medical records, various measurements, MRI images, etc. All data were placed within the public domain and made available over the Internet so that researchers could test various hypotheses about the relationships among genotype, environment and phenotype. Participants could decide what data they are comfortable to publish publicly and could choose to upload additional data or remove existing data at their own convenience.

An important part of the project was the exploration of the resulting risks to the participants, such as possible discrimination by insurers and employers if the genome shows a predisposition for certain diseases.

The PGP is establishing an international network of sites, including the United States (Harvard PGP), Canada (University of Toronto / Hospital for Sick Kids), and other countries that adhere to certain "conforming implementation" criteria such as no promise of anonymity and data return. The Harvard Medical School Institutional Review Board requested that the first set of volunteers include the principal investigator George Church and other diverse stakeholders in the scientific, medical, and social implications of personal genomes, because they were well positioned to give highly informed consent. As sequencing technology becomes cheaper, and the societal issues mentioned above are worked out, it was hoped that a large number of volunteers from all walks of life would participate. The long-term goal was that every person have access to his or her genotype to be used for personalized medical decisions.

The first ten volunteers were referred to as the "PGP-10". These volunteers were:

1. Misha Angrist, Duke Institute for Genome Sciences and Policy
2. Keith Batchelder, Genomic Healthcare Strategies
3. Esther Dyson, EDventure Holdings
4. Rosalynn Gill-Garrison, Sciona
5. John Halamka, Harvard Medical School
6. Stan Lapidus, Helicos BioSciences
7. Kirk Maxey, Cayman Chemical
8. James Sherley, Boston stem cell researcher
9. Steven Pinker, Harvard

In order to enroll, each participant must pass a series of short online tests to ensure that they are providing informed consent. By 2012, 2000 participants had enrolled and by November 2017 10,000 had joined the project.

In July 2014, at the 'Genetics, Genomics and Global Health—Inequalities, Identities and Insecurities' conference, Stephan Beck, the head of the UK arm of this project indicated that they had over 1000 volunteers, and had temporarily paused collection data due to lack of funding. As of November 2016, the pause was still in effect.

Since 2016, participants of the PGP could choose to obtain their whole-genome sequenced performed for $999. In the same year Complete Genomics contributed over 184 phased human genomes to the project.

In February 2018, the results were published of the first 56 Canadian participants who had their whole genome analyzed. Several DNA mutations that would have been expected by expert consensus to affect health of the participants had not done so, indicating that getting health data from the human genome was difficult.

== PGP Lumosity Project ==
On March 9, 2017, producers of the popular online brain-training program Lumosity announced they would collaborate with Harvard researchers to investigate the relationship between genetics and memory, attention, and reaction speed.

Scientists at the Wyss Institute for Biologically Inspired Engineering and the Harvard Medical School Personal Genome Project (PGP) planned to recruit 10,000 members from the PGP, to perform a set of cognitive tests from Lumos Labs’ NeuroCognitive Performance Test, a brief, repeatable, online assessment to evaluate participants’ memory functions, including object recall, object pattern memorization, and response times. The researchers would then correlate extremely high performance scores with naturally occurring variations in the participants’ genomes. To validate their findings, the team would sequence, edit, and visualize DNA, model neuronal development in 3-D brain organoids ex vivo, and finally test emerging hypotheses in experimental models of neurodegeneration.

== See also ==
- Human Genome Project
- Personal genomics
