= Samurai Marathon =

- Film poster
- Directed by: Bernard Rose
- Screenplay by: Bernard Rose; Hiroshi Saito; Kikumi Yamagishi
- Based on: The Marathon Samurai: Five Tales of Japan’s First Marathon by Akihiro Dobashi
- Produced by: Jeremy Thomas; Toshiaki Nakazawa
- Starring: Takeru Satoh; Nana Komatsu; Mirai Moriyama; Shōta Sometani; Munetaka Aoki; Naoto Takenaka; Danny Huston; Etsushi Toyokawa; Hiroki Hasegawa
- Cinematography: Takuro Ishizaka
- Music by: Philip Glass
- Production companies: Recorded Picture Company; Sedic International
- Distributed by: Signature Entertainment (UK); Gaga Corporarion (Japan)
- Release date: February 2019 (Japan)
- Running time: 104 minutes
- Countries: Japan; United Kingdom
- Languages: Japanese; English

Samurai Marathon (Japanese: サムライマラソン, Hepburn: Samurai Marason) is a 2019 Japanese-British historical action adventure film co-written and directed by Bernard Rose and starring Takeru Satoh, Nana Komatsu and Mirai Moriyama. It is based on the 2014 novel The Marathon Samurai: Five Tales of Japan’s First Marathon by Akihiro Dobashi, itself inspired by the origin story of the Ansei Toashi 30-km footrace held annually in Annaka City.

== Plot summary ==
In 1855, a daimyo sends his men on a grueling marathon to discover if they're tough enough to face the newly arrived Americans. Misunderstanding his intent, the Shogun dispatches assassins.

== Cast ==
- Takeru Satoh as Karasawa Jinnai
- Nana Komatsu as Princess Yuki
- Mirai Moriyama as Tsujimura Heikurō
- Shōta Sometani as Uesugi Hironoshin
- Munetaka Aoki as Ueki Yoshikuni
- Ryu Kohata
- Yuta Koseki
- Motoki Fukami
- Shinsuke Katō
- Joey Iwanaga
- Ruka Wakabayashi
- Mariko Tsutsui
- Mugi Kadowaki
- Nao
- Junko Abe
- Taishi Nakagawa
- Naoto Takenaka as Kurita Mataemon
- Danny Huston as Commodore Perry
- Etsushi Toyokawa as Ioki Suketora
- Hiroki Hasegawa as Itakura Katsuakira

== Release ==
The film was released in theaters in Japan in February 2019. It was later featured at the Edinburgh International Film Festival in June 2019. Well Go USA Entertainment acquired North American distribution rights to the film in July 2019. The film was released on VOD and digital platforms in May 2020. It was also released on DVD and Blu-Ray in the United States on July 21, 2020.

== Reception ==
The film has a 78% rating on Rotten Tomatoes. James Hadfield of The Japan Times awarded the film three stars out of five.
