= The Ghastly Love of Johnny X =

- Theatrical Release Poster
- Directed by: Paul Bunnell
- Written by: Steve Bingen; Paul Bunnell; Mark D. Murphy; George Wagner
- Produced by: Paul Bunnell; John Duffy; Mark Willoughby; Kristina West
- Starring: Will Keenan; Creed Bratton; De Anna Joy Brooks; Reggie Bannister; Les Williams; Jed Rowen; Kate Maberly; Paul Williams; Kevin McCarthy
- Cinematography: Francisco Bulgarelli
- Edited by: Russell Harnden III
- Music by: Ego Plum
- Production company: Ottermole Moving Picture Company
- Distributed by: Strand Releasing
- Release date: March 6, 2012
- Running time: 106 minutes
- Country: United States
- Language: English
- Budget: $2 million
- Box office: $2,436

The Ghastly Love of Johnny X is a 2012 American musical science fiction comedy film written, produced, and directed by Paul Bunnell. It stars Will Keenan, Creed Bratton, and De Anna Joy Brooks, Reggie Bannister, Les Williams, Jed Rowen and features, in supporting roles, Kate Maberly, Paul Williams and Kevin McCarthy. It was the last feature film shot in Kodak Plus-X.

It was the last film featuring Kevin McCarthy, who died two years before its release.

The film is an homage to 1950s’ sci-fi, teen and the rock and roll of the era. It follows the adventures of Johnny X, an alien on Earth who is chasing his ex-girlfriend after she steals his powerful invention: the resurrection suit.

== Plot ==
Johnny X (Will Keenan) is an alien banished to Earth with his loyal followers. They take up the guise of a greaser gang and drive through the desert. Meanwhile, at a diner, a woman named Bliss (De Anna Joy Brooks)—who is Johnny's ex-girlfriend—asks an employee named Chip (Les Williams) to run away with her. Johnny and his gang show up and Johnny uses a glove with mysterious powers to control Bliss. Chip manages to back a car up over the glove, breaking it and freeing Bliss.

Chip and Bliss escape to an empty drive-in movie theater. She explains that Johnny invented a "resurrection suit" that could give him control over anyone with special metal implants. Though Johnny had the right hand glove, she stole the rest of the suit and that is why Johnny is chasing her.

A concert promoter named King Clayton (Reggie Bannister) comes to Johnny and reveals where Bliss is heading. Clayton then asks for a favor in return for the information. He explains that Johnny's long-lost father and rock star Mickey O'Flynn (Creed Bratton) died suddenly and he wants Johnny to use the resurrection suit to control the musician's corpse for a concert. Johnny agrees to do so because doing an unselfish act will allow him and his gang to return to their home planet.

Gang member Sluggo (Jed Rowen), however, overloads the resurrection suit during the show and this causes O'Flynn to become a zombie. Sluggo and O'Flynn then leave the concert hall together. They track down Bliss, whom Sluggo drugs and kidnaps.

Sluggo demands Johnny bring him the resurrection suit so he can fulfill a plan to create a whole army of zombies. Johnny complies and reunites with O'Flynn. As his zombie father dies for a second time, he tells Johnny not to fail Bliss like he failed Johnny. The gang puts up a fight and defeats Sluggo. This is just the selfless act they need to be allowed to return to their home planet.

Johnny and Bliss, however, decide to stay on Earth and drive away together.

== Cast ==
- Will Keenan as Johnny X
- Creed Bratton as Mickey O'Flynn
- De Anna Joy Brooks as Bliss
- Reggie Bannister as King Clayton
- Les Williams as Chip
- Jed Rowen as Sluggo
- Kate Maberly as Dandi Conners
- Paul Williams as Cousin Quilty
- Kevin McCarthy as The Grand Inquisitor

== Reception ==
The film opened in a single theater on October 26, 2012 and grossed $86 in the first weekend. At the end of its run (of merely two theaters), the film had grossed $2,436.
