= Fade to Black (2006 film) =

- Directed by: Oliver Parker
- Written by: Oliver Parker; Davide Ferrario (book)
- Produced by: James Spring; Jonathan Olsberg; Barbary Thompson
- Starring: Danny Huston; Diego Luna; Paz Vega; Christopher Walken
- Cinematography: John de Borman
- Edited by: Guy Bensley
- Music by: Charlie Mole
- Distributed by: Lionsgate
- Release dates: 9 October 2006 (Hamburg Film Festival); 30 March 2007 (Spain); 25 May 2007 (Serbia)
- Running time: 104 minutes
- Country: United Kingdom
- Language: English

Fade to Black is a 2006 British political thriller drama film directed by Oliver Parker and starring Danny Huston as Orson Welles.

== Plot ==
In 1947 Hollywood, Orson Welles had a divorce from Rita Hayworth. When he travels to Rome for the lead role in Black Magic, an actor is murdered on set and Welles finds himself allured by the deceased's beautiful stepdaughter. Soon he becomes embroiled in dangerous political games as the run-up to post-war elections surfaces.

== Cast ==
- Danny Huston as Orson Welles
- Diego Luna as Tommaso Moreno
- Paz Vega as Lea Padovani
- Christopher Walken as Brewster
- Nathaniel Parker as Viola
- Anna Galiena as Aida Padovani
- Violante Placido as Stella
- Pino Ammendola as Grisha
