= Master and Man (short story) =

1895 short story by Leo Tolstoy

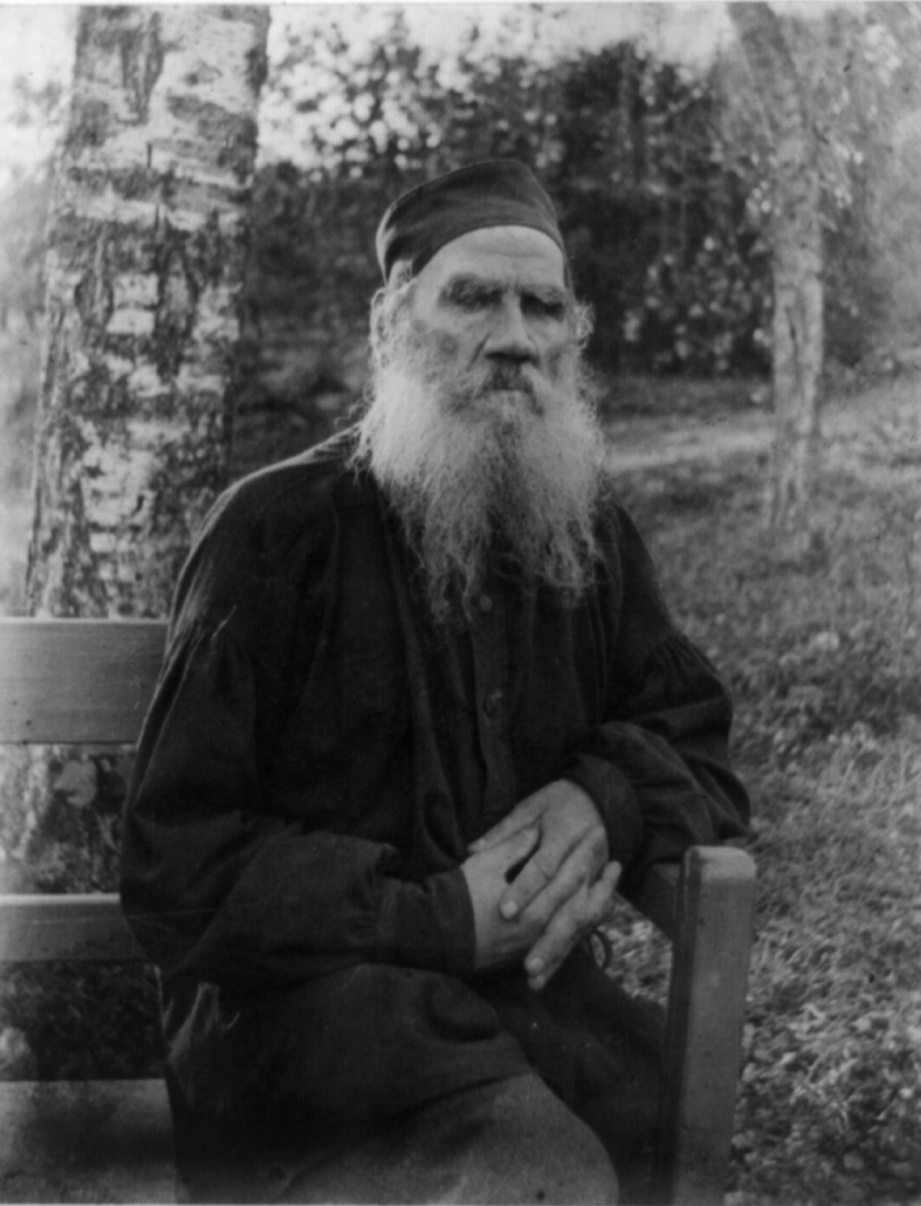
Leo Tolstoy, author of Master and Man (short story)

"Master and Man" (Russian: Хозяин и работник) is an 1895 short story by Leo Tolstoy.

== Plot summary ==
In this short story, a land owner named Vasili Andreyevich Brekhunov takes one of his peasants, Nikita, for a short journey by sleigh. They are traveling to visit another landowner so that Vasili Andreyevich can make a land purchase at a bargain price. He is impatient and wishes to get there more quickly before other contenders can get there.

The two men find themselves in the middle of a blizzard, but the master, in his avarice, wishes to press on. Due to snow, they find themselves losing the road and getting lost. They eventually find themselves in a town and stop to rest. Vasily Andreyevich decides they must set back out.

The men lose the road and the horse gets tired out, so they decide to try to sleep out the night and find their way in the morning. Nikita, who is not as warmly dressed as Vasily Andreyevich, soon finds himself about to die from hypothermia.

Vasily Andreyevich decides to leave Nikita to die and sets out on his own on the horse. He wanders through the snow in circles and eventually falls off the horse, finding himself back by Nikita and the sleigh. The master attains a spiritual/moral revelation, and Tolstoy repeats one of his famous themes: that the only true happiness in life is found by living for others.

The master then lies on top of the peasant to keep him warm through the cold night. In the morning, peasants dig out the sleigh, which was only a kilometer from the safety of a village. They find Vasily Andreyevich and the horse dead but Nikita is still alive.

== Film adaptation ==
The short story was adapted into the 2012 British film Boxing Day.

== See also ==
- Leo Tolstoy bibliography
