= Boxing Day (2012 film) =

2012 film by Bernard Rose

- Directed by: Bernard Rose
- Produced by: Naomi Despres; Luc Roeg
- Starring: Danny Huston; Matthew Jacobs
- Music by: Nick Taylor
- Production companies: Independent; Lipsync Productions
- Distributed by: Independent
- Release dates: 2 September 2012 (Venice); 21 December 2012
- Running time: 94 minutes
- Country: United Kingdom
- Language: English

Boxing Day is a 2012 British film written and directed by Bernard Rose. The film is roughly based on the 1895 Leo Tolstoy short story "Master and Man".

The film premiered at the 2012 Venice Film Festival.

== Plot ==
An arrogant real estate developer named Basil and his unreliable hired chauffeur Nick battle the elements during a Boxing Day blizzard in Denver, Colorado.

== Cast ==
- Danny Huston as Basil
- Matthew Jacobs as Nick
- Edie Dakota as Waitress
- Lisa Enos as Marianne
- Jo Farkas as Church Lady
- Julie Marcus as Cynthia (voice)
- Dave Pressler as Banker
- Morgan Walsh
