= Smart Money (1986 film) =

- Directed by: Bernard Rose
- Starring: Spencer Leigh
- Release date: 26 October 1986
- Country: United Kingdom
- Language: English

Smart Money is a BBC film made in 1986 which was written by Matthew Jacobs and directed by Bernard Rose. It stars Spencer Leigh, Bruce Payne and Richard Borthwick.

== Plot ==
The film is a thriller about computer fraud. Leon, a computer hacker, and Freak, a programmer, team up with Fast Eddie, a video games expert, to get revenge on Lawrence McNeice ("a hired hand for" several corporations), who framed Leon for a computer fraud he didn't commit.

Lawrence McNiece is the head of computer security in a large corporation. Leon is a computer hacker, imprisoned for a fraud. The story implies that McNiece was involved in some way, although it is not made clear exactly why Leon wants revenge on him. When Leon was sentenced to prison the shock caused his dad to have a heart attack. Leon looks for revenge for his father's death and whatever events transpired to put Leon away in the first place.

Leon hangs around in an arcade and meets an intimidating bald headed man who bullies him into wagering money. The man introduces a beautiful young woman, Edith who goes by the name Fast Eddie. Leon wagers his last £5 and plays the Atari arcade game TX-1, a three screen racing game of the era. Leon plays as well as he can, but Eddie is extremely good at TX-1 and thrashes him. He loses his money.

Leon returns to the arcade the following night and meets up with Eddie. He tells her that she is "the fastest I've ever seen" and recruits her into his gang. The intimidating man is stabbed in the arcade for reasons that are not made clear, so Leon and Eddie run away. Eddie (real name Edith) introduces Leon to a boy known as Freak. Freak is a hacker, and joins the gang. Between Leon's hacker knowledge, Freak's hacker skillset and Eddie's incredible typing speed, the gang is complete and Leon introduces them to his plan. They are going to steal money from the CHAPS computer system, the security of which is the responsibility of McNeice. Leon explains that every financial transaction performed by CHAPS results in cash amounts that are rounded down to the nearest whole penny, and he wants Freak to write a program that they can upload to McNeice's computer to put those fractions of pennies into their own bank account. No one will notice the missing money as the fractions of pennies are usually rounded down, so the financial institutions will not see anything is missing.

But first, they will need to find a way to get access to McNiece's computer system. With Eddie playing the part of a magazine interviewer, she meets McNeice and tries to obtain information about CHAPS. Meanwhile, Freak is thrown out of his house by his parents who disapprove of his activities and sell all his computer equipment. Freak needs this equipment to work, so he takes a job at a security software expo. He is paid to show his computer hacking skills to the attendees in order that they purchase security software. In reality, Freak is using the system to access CHAPS.

Eddie's relationship with Leon becomes closer, but Leon feels jealous as Eddie's pretend relationship with McNiece also becomes closer. In a twist, Eddie learns that McNiece knows about the gang, and he whispers to her that he is "just like them... I'm just a lot better at it." Eddie and McNiece make love, and Freak manages to install his software onto McNeice's computer, whilst McNiece is distracted by having his nob out.

Freak manages to sneak his malicious code into a "fisheries game" while McNiece and Eddie are at it like rabbits. The game's payload should be triggered if someone plays the game, and Freak and Leon are nervous, hoping this will work.

Eddie arrives home, after her night of romance, but Leon is visibly upset by this turn of events. Eddie explains that she had no choice but to distract McNiece with sex, but does not make Leon aware that McNeice knows what they are up to. The important thing for Leon and Eddie is that the software did upload, and all they have to do is hope that someone triggers it.

The evening of romance and computer talk alters the dynamic of all concerned. Leon is now jealous of McNiece and Eddie's relationship. Eddie knows that McNeice is aware of the gang, and he could presumably stop them at any time, yet he has not done so.

The next day, an employee of McNiece's company triggers the software payload by playing the fisheries game. McNeice is angry that someone has access to the computer system, and loudly plays the role of the security expert fighting to lock his computers down from the intrusion. Meanwhile, Freak at the expo is hacking into the system and the battle between Freak and McNiece plays out with Freak the winner. Massive sums of money now lie in the gang's account, with McNeice screaming that he is locked out of his own system. McNiece's furious and overly demonstrative attempts to stop the hacker are at odds with his quiet apologies to his bosses, as he explains he will get the money back. McNiece is saying all the right things, but does not seem to be trustworthy because we know he is in a relationship with Eddie and her gang just stole the money. Did McNiece really try and prevent the theft when he was shouting so loudly, or did he let them get away with it?

Freak, Eddie and Leon are rich on their stolen earnings, and the money is split into briefcases. As the gang are about to go their separate ways with their money, McNeice arrives at the flat. Eddie seems to have been expecting this visit, and she explains that she is working with McNeice and has decided that they should give the money back. It seems obvious to Leon that Eddie and McNiece are together as a couple and McNiece is just stealing the money. Eddie and McNeice leave with the briefcase of cash handcuffed to McNeice's wrist. They leave, get into McNeice's Ferrari and Eddie drives. They discuss that they are heading for the airport and laugh as they appear to have got away with the crime, leaving Leon and Freak to take the blame.

Leon decides to chase after them and in his hurry to leave he doesn't hear Freak shouting out of the window that this is all a set-up. The briefcase of money that is handcuffed to McNeice is just one-third of the cash and Eddie has a plan. Leon steals a car, and chases Eddie, although his choice of vehicle leave a lot to be desired. Leon has no chance of catching up with a Ferrari.

Eddie misses the turn off for the airport, and McNiece asks what is going on. Eddie explains that they are going to the police but she will not be there when he has to explain why he has hundreds of thousands of pounds of stolen money handcuffed to his wrist. She drives faster and faster and the film is inter-cut with images from the Atari TX-1 game she played earlier. The car is crashed, McNeice is trapped, and the police arrive to find Eddie (and the remaining briefcases of cash) are nowhere to be seen.

Leon catches up with the accident, and is surprised to meet Eddie, who still has the remaining huge sums of money. As they leave, safe and unknown to the police, they discuss what their next caper will be.

== Cast ==
- Richard Borthwick as Mr Kyle
- Sean Edwards as Freak
- Spencer Leigh as Leon
- Bruce Payne as Lawrence McNiece
- Alexandra Pigg as Fast Eddie

== Reception ==
Although the film received mixed to negative reviews, it is notable for its highly accurate computer hacking scenes using authentic software instead of mock-up graphics. The film was released on VHS in America, and at least one of the actors had their dialogue replaced as it was felt that American Audiences would not be able to understand the English regional dialects. Dialogue was also changed to remove British slang and some strong language was removed. For example, the British term 'loo' was changed to 'johns' and 'bastard' was changed to 'slimeball' on the US VHS. Most of Leon's dialogue was re-voiced and he seems considerably more soft-spoken in the US version.

The original BBC TV version has never seen a commercial release in the UK.
