= Paul Booth (media scholar) =

American media scholar

- Occupation: University Professor
- Employer: DePaul University
- Title: Professor, Associate Dean

Academic background
- Education: Rensselaer Polytechnic Institute (Ph.D.); Northern Illinois University (M.A.); University of Illinois at Urbana–Champaign (B.A.)
- Thesis: Fandom Studies: Fan studies Re-written, Re-read, Re-produced

Academic work
- Discipline: Media Scholar
- Sub-discipline: Fandom & Board Game Studies

Paul Booth is an American media scholar, professor of Media and Pop Culture, and Associate Dean of Student Affairs and Engagement at DePaul University in Chicago, Illinois. He serves on the editorial board of a number of journals, including Transformative Works and Cultures and the Journal of Fandom Studies. He also oversees the annual DePaul Pop Culture Conference.

== Early life and education ==
Booth earned a bachelor's degree in English literature from the University of Illinois at Urbana–Champaign (where he performed in the improv comedy troupe Spicy Clamato), before earning a master's degree in communication from Northern Illinois University and a Ph.D. in rhetoric and communication from Rensselaer Polytechnic Institute. His dissertation was entitled Fandom Studies: Fan studies Re-written, Re-read, Re-produced (2009).

== Books ==
=== Authored ===
- 2010. Digital Fandom: New Media Studies. New York City: Peter Lang.
- 2012. Time on TV: Temporal Displacement and Mashup Television. New York City: Peter Lang.
- 2015. Playing Fans: Negotiating Fandom and Media in the Digital Age. Iowa City: University of Iowa Press.
- 2015. Game Play: Paratextuality in Contemporary Board Games. London: Bloomsbury Academic.
- 2016. Digital Fandom 2.0: New Media Studies. New York City: Peter Lang.
- 2017. Crossing Fandoms: SuperWhoLock and the Contemporary Fan Audience. London: Palgrave Macmillan.
- 2018. Poaching Politics: Online Communication During the 2016 Presidential Election (with Amber Davisson, Aaron Hess, and Ashley Hinck). New York City: Peter Lang.
- 2020. Watching Doctor Who: Fan Reception and Evaluation (with Craig Owen Jones). London: Bloomsbury Academic.
- 2021. Board Games as Media. London: Bloomsbury Academic.

=== Edited ===
- 2013. Fan Phenomena: Doctor Who. Bristol, UK: Intellect Books.
- 2016. Controversies in Digital Ethics (edited with Amber Davisson). London: Bloomsbury Academic.
- 2016. Seeing Fans: Representations of Fandom in Media and Popular Culture (edited with Lucy Bennett). London: Bloomsbury Academic.
- 2018. Wiley Companion to Media Fandom and Fan Studies. Hoboken, NJ: Blackwell Publishing.
- 2021. A Fan Studies Primer (edited with Rebecca Williams). Iowa City: University of Iowa Press.
- 2023. Adventures Across Space and Time (edited with Matt Hills, Joy Piedmont, and Tansy Rayner Roberts). London: Bloomsbury Academic.
- 2025. Entering the Multiverse: Perspective on Alternative Universes and Parallel Worlds. London: Routledge
