= John Halamka =

American physician

John D. Halamka, M.D., M.S., is an American business executive and physician. He is president of the Mayo Clinic Platform, a group of digital and long-distance health care initiatives.

Trained in emergency medicine and medical informatics, Halamka has been developing and implementing health care information strategy and policy for more than 25 years. He specializes in artificial intelligence, the adoption of electronic health records and the secure sharing of healthcare data for care coordination, population health, and quality improvement.

In 2020, Halamka was elected to the National Academy of Medicine (NAM).

Prior to his appointment at Mayo Clinic, he was chief information officer at Beth Israel Deaconess Medical Center. He is a practicing emergency medicine physician.

As the International Healthcare Innovation Professor at Harvard Medical School, Halamka helped the George W. Bush administration, the Obama administration and governments around the world plan their health care information strategies.

== Early life and education ==
Halamka was born in Des Moines, Iowa and relocated to Southern California in 1968. He attended St. James Elementary School and Palos Verdes High School.

He graduated from Stanford University in 1984 with degrees in Public Policy and Medical Microbiology. While at Stanford he wrote econometrics software for Milton Friedman, performed research for the autobiography of Dr. Edward Teller, and served as teaching assistant to presidential candidate John B. Anderson. He authored three books on technology issues, wrote a regular column for InfoWorld, and was founding technical editor for Computer Language magazine.

In 1981, he formed a software startup company, Ibis Research Labs, in the basement of Frederick Terman's Palo Alto home. The company developed tax and accounting software for CP/M and early IBM PC computers; it grew to have 25 employees and was sold to senior management in 1992.

He attended the joint MD/PhD program at UCSF and UC Berkeley between 1984 & 1993 and completed an Emergency Medicine residency at Harbor-UCLA Medical Center between 1993 & 1996.

== Information technology ==
In November 2019, Halamka joined Mayo Clinic and was named president of Mayo Clinic Platform. He is charged with elevating Mayo Clinic to a global leadership position within digital healthcare.

Halamka joined the faculty of Harvard Medical School as an instructor in 1996. He completed a post doctoral fellowship in medical informatics at Harvard and MIT in 1997. Soon after, he was selected to be the executive director of CareGroup Center for Quality and Value (CQV), a data analysis and business intelligence division of the Caregroup Healthcare System.

In 1998, he was named chief information officer of Beth Israel Deaconess Medical Center and initiated a multi-year effort to securely web-enable clinical information systems with CareWeb. In 2001, he was hired as part-time chief information officer at Harvard Medical School. In 2004, he was named chairman of the Healthcare Information Technology Standards Panel (HITSP). In April 2011, he was named full professor at Harvard Medical School.

In August 2011, he was named co-chair of the Massachusetts HIT/HIE Advisory Committee, a multi-stakeholder group which advises the Massachusetts HIT Council, the governance body which sets priorities and approves the allocation of state and federal funds for healthcare information technology spending in Massachusetts.

In March 2012, he was named to the board of the Open Source Electronic Health Record Agent (OSEHRA), a non-profit established by the Department of Veterans Affairs, dedicated to accelerating innovation in electronic health record software.

In December 2019, he was named the president of the Mayo Clinic Platform, to commence January 1, 2020. The platform is a coordinated portfolio approach to create new platform ventures to take advantage of emerging technologies such as artificial intelligence, connected healthcare devices, and natural language processing.

== Other interests ==
Halamka continues his work as an emergency physician, and provides mushroom and poisonous plant consultation to the Regional Center for Poison Control and Prevention (Boston).

In 2012, Halamka and his wife Kathy founded Unity Farm, an organic certified producer of fruits, vegetables, and cider. In 2016, they founded Unity Farm Sanctuary, a charitable organization providing forever homes to farm animals in need, in addition to community education and volunteer opportunities.

He also writes the blog Geekdoctor: Dispatch from the Digital Health Frontier.

Halamka has authored the following books:

- Reinventing Clinical Decision Support: Data Analytics, Artificial Intelligence, and Diagnostic Reasoning (co-authored by Paul Cerrato)
- The Best of CP/M Software
- Real World Unix
- Espionage in the Silicon Valley
- The Fifth Domain (co-authored with Giuliano Pozza)
- GeekDoctor: Life as a Healthcare CIO
- Realizing the Promise of Precision Medicine: The Role of Patient Data, Mobile Technology, and Consumer Engagement (co-authored by Paul Cerrato)
- The Transformative Power of Mobile Medicine: Leveraging Innovation, Seizing Opportunities and Overcoming Obstacles of mHealth (co-authored by Paul Cerrato)

== See also ==
- Personal Genome Project
