= Feature Films for Families =

Feature Films For Families, Inc.
- Type: Private
- Industry: Entertainment
- Founded: 1988
- Founder: Forrest S. Baker III
- Website: https://web.archive.org/web/20230316062035/https://www.familyfilmsonline.com/

Feature Films for Families (FFF) was an American film production and distribution company founded in Utah in 1988 by Forrest S. Baker III. The company specialized in family-oriented films and marketed its products directly to consumers, including through telemarketing.

The company produced films including The ButterCream Gang (1992) and The Velveteen Rabbit (2009). It was the subject of several legal disputes concerning its telemarketing practices, including federal proceedings in which a jury found the defendants liable for violations of the Telemarketing Sales Rule. The Better Business Bureau's profile lists the company as out of business since 2018.

== History ==
Feature Films for Families began by marketing and selling family-oriented films directly to parents by telephone.

By 1992, the company had expanded into original film production. Its first production, In Your Wildest Dreams, was followed by The ButterCream Gang, a children's film about a group of boys committed to helping others in their community. According to a contemporary Deseret News report, The ButterCream Gang sold 479,000 copies in its first six months, substantially exceeding the average sales reported for videos distributed through conventional outlets. The company subsequently produced titles including Split Infinity and Seasons of the Heart.

In 2009, FFF was among the production companies behind the theatrical film The Velveteen Rabbit. The company's telemarketing practices also led to a lawsuit by Verizon over calls promoting the film.

In 2012, the company entered into a deal with Freestyle Digital Media to distribute its film library through video on demand services. By the company's final years, it had also attempted a subscription-based streaming service, according to a 2025 retrospective in Crooked Marquee. The service experienced technical problems in 2024, and the company's website subsequently became inaccessible.

On June 21, 2024, the company's founder, Forrest S Baker III, died. His obituary reported that the company employed approximately 1,400 people at its peak.

== Legal disputes ==
=== Missouri telemarketing dispute ===
In 2006, FFF partnered with the Dove Foundation to call households to promote its films. In doing so, it contacted several people on the state's No Call List, and was sued by Missouri's attorney general. The Dove Foundation and FFF agreed to pay $70,000 and agreed to stop calling people in Missouri, but did not admit wrongdoing.

=== Verizon/Velveteen Rabbit litigation ===
In 2009, Verizon sued the company, alleging that they were illegally using an auto dialer to contact Verizon customers to promote the film The Velveteen Rabbit. Feature Films for Families agreed to a $25,000 cash settlement

=== Federal Trade Commission / Department of Justice litigation ===
In 2011, the US Federal Trade Commission (FTC) filed a lawsuit against FFF, alleging that they had called people on the national Do Not Call list, used misleading caller IDs, and ignored individual requests to not be contacted.

In 2016, a federal jury found FFF and its affiliates liable for more than 117 million violations of the Telemarketing Sales Rule, including violations involving calls to numbers on the National Do Not Call Registry and deceptive caller identification.

In 2018, a federal court entered a final judgment imposing a civil penalty of $45,487,735. Of that amount, $487,735 was payable immediately, while the remaining amount was conditionally suspended based on the defendants' financial condition and compliance with the order's requirements.

During the litigation, a dispute arose over the parties' conduct during mediation. Judge Clark Waddoups ordered the FTC to pay $81,201.94 in sanctions after finding that it had failed to mediate in good faith.

== Cultural impact ==
The ButterCream Gang became a familiar children's film in some communities during the 1990s. A 2023 retrospective in the Deseret News described the film's particular ubiquity in Utah, while noting that its popularity was less widespread elsewhere. In 1993, the newspaper also reported that children in Springfield, Oregon, had formed groups inspired by the film that performed acts of service in their community.

The Public Religion Research Institute has described FFF films as promoting themes of American exceptionalism in ways that could appeal to evangelicals outside the company's predominantly Latter-day Saint Utah audience, citing The ButterCream Gang as an example of an FFF production that found its way into evangelical households

The company's films were also marketed within the broader Christian family-entertainment market. The Dove Foundation, an evangelical Christian organization that reviews entertainment for family suitability, maintains an archive of Feature Films for Families productions and rates many of them as “Dove Approved.”
