= Stephan Beck =

German geneticist

- Education: University of Konstanz
- Known for: Human Genome Project; DNA methylation; Epigenome-wide association study
- Scientific career
- Workplaces: University College London; University of Cambridge

Stephan Beck FMedSci is a German-British geneticist and Professor of Medical Genomics at the University College London Cancer Institute.

== Research ==
Stephan Beck received his PhD in 1985 from the University of Konstanz, where he studied DNA structure. He held positions at the MRC Laboratory of Molecular Biology in Cambridge, Millipore Corporation in Boston, and the Imperial Cancer Research Fund in London, before joining the Wellcome Trust Sanger Institute in 1996. As Head of Human Sequencing (1998–2006), Beck participated in sequencing and analyzing the human and mouse genomes and established the first DNA methylation maps of human chromosomes 6, 20, and 22.

He is the director of the Personal Genome Project UK, and serves on the advisory board of the Human Epigenome Project. Beck is a Fellow of the Academy of Medical Sciences and a recipient of a Royal Society Wolfson Research Merit Award.

Beck is the principal investigator of the medical genomics team at the University College London Cancer Institute.
