= Gillian White (writer) =

British novelist (1945–2020)

Gillian White

Gillian White (1945-2020; pen name, Georgina Fleming) was a British novelist and journalist, several of whose works were adapted for television.

== Life ==
She was born on 6 February 1945 in Streatham, south London, and was adopted as a baby by Ted and Lily Smith of Wirral, Merseyside, where she grew up. She had a difficult childhood, was expelled from three schools, and ran away to London, where a social worker helped her to obtain a job as a junior reporter on a newspaper in Harlow, Essex. There she met journalist Ron White, and they married in 1967. In the 1970s, they moved to Cornwall where they farmed. When her children were teenagers she began to write, and after publishing several books with Rainbow Romances in 1988 she published The Plague Stone in 1989.

Her fourth book, Rich Deceiver (1992) was adapted for television in two parts by the BBC in 1995, directed by Gurinder Chadha and starring Lesley Dunlop and John McCardle. Gina McKee starred in the 1997 television version of Mothertime (1996), and Keeley Hawes in the 1997 adaptation of the 1996 book The Beggar Bride, The Sleeper (2000), in two parts, starred Eileen Atkins, Anna Massey and George Cole.

White's obituary in The Guardian said that "Jealousy, revenge, greed and despair motivated Gill's characters, and she also examined class conflict, dysfunctional families, domestic violence, poverty and lack of opportunity in society."

She lived in Totnes toward the end of her life and died on 24 July 2020. She had four children, thirteen grandchildren, and two great-grandchildren.

== Selected publications ==
- White, Gillian (1990). The plague stone. London: Century. ISBN 0712637494.
- White, Gill (1990). The crow biddy. Century. ISBN 0712639322.
- White, Gillian (1991). Nasty habits. Century. ISBN 0712647724.
- White, Gillian (1992). Rich deceiver. London: Orion. ISBN 1857970128.
- White, Gill (1993). Mothertime. London: Orion. ISBN 1857970098.
- White, Gill (1997). The beggar bride. London: Phoenix. ISBN 1857998448.
- White, Gill (1997). Chain reaction. London: Orion. ISBN 0752804391.
- White, Gill (1998). The sleeper. London: Corgi. ISBN 0552145610.
- White, Gill (1999). Unhallowed ground. London: Corgi. ISBN 0552145637.

=== As Georgina Fleming ===
- Fleming, Georgina (1990). Spirit of the sea. Century. ISBN 978-0712639316.
- Fleming, Georgina (1991). The light to my darkness. London: Century. ISBN 978-0712646932.
- Fleming, Georgina (1993). Beyond the shadowlands. London: Orion. ISBN 978-1857970159.
