= Anna Karenina (1997 film) =

1997 American period drama film

- Theatrical release poster
- Directed by: Bernard Rose
- Screenplay by: Bernard Rose
- Based on: Anna Karenina; 1878 novel by Leo Tolstoy
- Produced by: Bruce Davey
- Starring: Sophie Marceau; Sean Bean; Alfred Molina; Mia Kirshner; James Fox
- Cinematography: Daryn Okada
- Edited by: Victor Du Bois
- Music by: Stewart Copeland
- Production company: Icon Productions
- Distributed by: Warner Bros.
- Release date: April 4, 1997
- Running time: 108 minutes
- Country: United States
- Language: English
- Budget: $30 million
- Box office: $2.1 million

Anna Karenina is a 1997 American period drama film written and directed by Bernard Rose and starring Sophie Marceau, Sean Bean, Alfred Molina, Mia Kirshner and James Fox. Based on the 1878 novel of the same name by Leo Tolstoy, the film is about a young and beautiful married woman who meets a handsome count, with whom she falls in love. Eventually, the conflict between her passionate desires and painful social realities leads to depression and despair.

The film is the only international version filmed entirely in Russia, at locations in Saint Petersburg and Moscow.

== Plot ==
Anna Karenina is the young and elegant wife of Alexei Karenin, a wealthy Russian nobleman twenty years her senior. She is unhappy and lives only for their son, Seriozha. During a ball in Moscow, she encounters the handsome Count Alexei Vronsky. Vronsky is instantly smitten and follows her to St. Petersburg, pursuing her shamelessly. Eventually, Anna surrenders to her feelings for him and becomes his mistress. Though they are happy together, their relationship soon crumbles after she miscarries his child. Karenin is deeply touched by her pain and agrees to forgive her. However, Anna remains unhappy and, to the scandal of respectable society, she openly leaves her husband for Vronsky.

Using her brother as an intermediary, Anna hopelessly begs her husband for a divorce. Karenin, under the poisonous influence of Anna's friend the Countess Lydia Ivanovna, indignantly refuses to divorce and denies her any access to Seriozha. Distraught by the loss of her son, Anna grows severely depressed and self-medicates with laudanum. Before long, she is hopelessly addicted. With Vronsky she has another child, but he is also torn between his love for Anna and the temptation of a respectable marriage in the eyes of society. Anna becomes certain that Vronsky is about to leave her and marry a younger woman. She travels to the railway station and commits suicide by jumping in front of a train.

Vronsky is emotionally devastated by her death and volunteers for a 'suicide mission' in the Balkan war. While travelling to join his regiment, he encounters Konstantin Levin at the train station. Levin has married Vronsky's former (and unrequited) sweetheart, Princess "Kitty" Shcherbatskaya. Levin attempts to persuade Vronsky of the value of life. Vronsky is despondent, and can only speak of how Anna's body looked at the railway station when he arrived to see her. They separate, and Levin watches the train depart, certain that he will never again see Vronsky.

Levin returns to his family. At home, he writes the events of everything that happened, and signs his manuscript: "Leo Tolstoy".

== Cast ==
- Sophie Marceau as Anna Arkadievna Karenina
- Sean Bean as Count Aleksei Kirillovich Vronskiy
- Alfred Molina as Konstantin Dmitrievich Levin
- Mia Kirshner as Princess Ekaterina Alexandrovna Shcherbatskaia, "Kitty"
- James Fox as Aleksei Aleksandrovitch Karenin
- Fiona Shaw as Countess Lidia Ivanovna
- Danny Huston as Prince Stepan Arkadievich Oblonsky, "Stiva"
- Saskia Wickham as Princess Darya Aleksandrovna Oblonskaya, "Dolly"
- Phyllida Law as Countess Vronskaya
- David Schofield as Nikolai Dmitrievich Levin
- Jennifer Caron Hall as Princess Elizaveta, "Betsy"
- Anna Calder-Marshall as Princess Schcherbatskaia
- Petr Shelokhonov as Kapitonich, Karenin's butler
- Vernon Dobtcheff as Pestov
- Larisa Kuznetsova as Agatha
- Jeremy Sheffield as Boris
- Justine Waddell as Countess Nordston
- Valerie Braddell as Embassadour's wife

== Production ==
The production was started with help from Mel Gibson, who was approached by Sophie Marceau, and initiated the main budget of about $20 million coming from his company Icon Productions. Casting was done by Marion Dougherty, casting director of Warner Bros. Studios. Screenplay was written by British writer/director Bernard Rose. The film was a joint production by Icon Productions and Warner Bros. Pictures with participation of Lenfilm studios in Saint Petersburg and Trite Studios in Moscow.

The film shows international cast of leading actors: French Sophie Marceau, British Sean Bean, Alfred Molina and James Fox, American Danny Huston, Canadian Mia Kirshner and others. Several Russian actors are cast in supporting roles. Most crew members came from the United Kingdom and the United States, some additional crew was hired from Trite Studio and the Lenfilm Studios in St. Petersburg, Russia. Filming was done entirely in Russia between February and August 1996. Main filming locations were in St. Petersburg, at the palaces of Russian Tsars and historic mansions of Russian Nobility, such as The Winter Palace, Peterhof, Menshikov Palace, Yusupov Palace, Nevsky Prospekt and other landmark locations. Two minor scenes were filmed in Moscow, Russia.

=== Post-production ===
Post-production was carried out partially in Europe, with the studio version editing being completed in the USA. The original director's cut was not released; it was reduced from 140 minutes to 108 minutes and distributed internationally by Warner Bros. The US theatrical premiere was in April 1997, followed by the European premiere in May 1997. Several DVD editions in Europe are variants of this title: "Tolstoi's Anna Karenina" and "Leo Tolstoi's Anna Karenina" and may vary in film running time from 104 to 108 minutes.

== Music ==
Music by Tchaikovsky, Rachmaninov, and Prokofiev was recorded in performance by the St. Petersburg Philharmonic Orchestra under the baton of Sir Georg Solti. The score was recorded in The St Petersburg Philharmonic Hall, where Tchaikovsky's Symphony No. 6, "Pathetique" first premiered. Incidentally, this symphony is played most prominently in key scenes from the film. Director Bernard Rose and Sir Georg Solti both agreed that the Symphony bore parallels with Anna Karenina's story, mainly for the music's excessively tragic tones and Anna's melancholy. The film's score was composed by Stewart Copeland.

== Reception ==
Rotten Tomatoes gives the film a score of 26% based on reviews from 19 critics, with an average rating of 4.70/10.

Roger Ebert of the Chicago Sun-Times gave the film 1 1/2 stars out of 4, saying "There is much more to Tolstoy's story—but not in this bloodless and shallow adaptation. Bernard Rose is a director of talent (his "Paperhouse" was a visionary film, and his "Immortal Beloved" was a biopic that brought great passion to the story of Beethoven). Here, shooting on fabulous locations, he seems to have lost track of his characters. The movie is like a storyboard for Anna Karenina with the life and subtlety still to be added." Stephen Holden of The New York Times called it a "sleek, cliffs notes version of a masterpiece" criticizing it for being "glossy and picture perfect on the surface and hollow at the core." Todd McCarthy of Variety wrote: "this effort is handsome thanks to the matchless locations, in this case those in and around St. Petersburg, opulent costumes and good-looking cast. But there is no dramatic urgency here and little more emotional resonance, problems that stem jointly from the adaptation, direction and casting."
