= Ivans Xtc =

- Theatrical release poster
- Directed by: Bernard Rose
- Screenplay by: Bernard Rose; Lisa Enos
- Based on: The Death of Ivan Ilyich by Leo Tolstoy
- Produced by: Lisa Enos
- Starring: Danny Huston; Peter Weller
- Cinematography: Ron Forsythe; Bernard Rose
- Edited by: Bernard Rose
- Music by: Matt Schultz; Elmo Weber
- Production companies: Enos/Rose Productions; Rhino Films
- Distributed by: Artistic License Films; Metro-Tartan Distribution
- Release dates: September 12, 2000 (TIFF); July 7, 2002 (NY/LA); July 19, 2002 (United Kingdom)
- Running time: 93 minutes
- Countries: United Kingdom; United States
- Language: English
- Budget: $136,000
- Box office: $47,027

Ivans Xtc is a 2000 British-American independent drama film co-written by Bernard Rose and Lisa Enos, produced by Enos and directed by Rose, the first of several Enos-Rose collaborations, including Snuff-Movie (2005), Kreutzer Sonata (2008) and Mr. Nice (2010). The film stars Danny Huston, Peter Weller, and Lisa Enos, with Rose and Enos' actual CAA agent, Adam Krentzmen, playing the role of fictional "Media Talent Agency" agent Barry Oaks. Other key roles include Morgan Walsh (Vukovic) as Lucy Lawrence, and SLC Punk director James Merendino as director Danny McTeague.

The story follows a Hollywood agent, Ivan Beckman (Huston), who must force a smile and carry on with business as usual with the agency's biggest client, Don West (Weller), in the face of a cancer diagnosis. The film, loosely based on Leo Tolstoy's 1886 novella The Death of Ivan Ilyich, was also inspired by the rise and fall of talent agent Jay Moloney.

== Cast ==
- Danny Huston as Ivan Beckman, a successful film agent working in Los Angeles
- Peter Weller as Don West, Beckman's client
- Lisa Enos as Charlotte White
- James Merendino as Danny McTeague
- Adam Krentzman as Barry Oaks
- Sarah Danielle Madison as Naomi
- Tiffani Thiessen as Marie Stein
- Dan Ireland as Ted Zimblest
- Lisa Henson as Margaret Mead
- Hal Lieberman as Lloyd Hall
- Valeria Golino as Constanza Vero
- Angela Featherstone as Amanda Hill
- Victoria Silvstedt as Melanie

== Production ==
Filming took place in July 1999 in Sherman Oaks and Los Angeles, and was originally intended as a "Dogme 95" film in which the key collaborators (Enos, Rose, DP Ron Forstye, Production Coordinator Morgan Vukovic, etc.) would be credited as "The Filmmakers". It was shot at 60i fps on the Sony HDW-700A HD video format digital camera, which proved problematic for theatrical distribution.

== Release ==
On its opening weekend in the United States and Canada, the film was ranked at #71, behind The Salton Sea, The Singles Ward and a re-release of Beauty and the Beast.

== Reception ==
Ivans Xtc received mostly positive reviews. On film aggregation website Rotten Tomatoes, it holds a 77% rating, with an average score of 6.8/10, sampled from reviews from 30 critics. It scored a 67/100 (citing "generally favorable" reviews) on Metacritic, based on reviews from 14 critics.

=== Accolades ===
Awards
Award	Category	Recipients and nominees	Result
British Independent Film Awards	Best Foreign Independent Film – English Language		Nominated
Independent Film Festival of Boston	Narrative	Bernard Rose	Won
Independent Spirit Awards	Best Director	Bernard Rose	Nominated
Independent Spirit Awards	Best Supporting Male	Peter Weller	Nominated
Independent Spirit Awards	Best Male Lead	Danny Huston	Nominated
Independent Spirit Awards	Independent Spirit John Cassavetes Award	Bernard Rose and Lisa Enos	Nominated
