= Bernard Rose (director) =

English film director

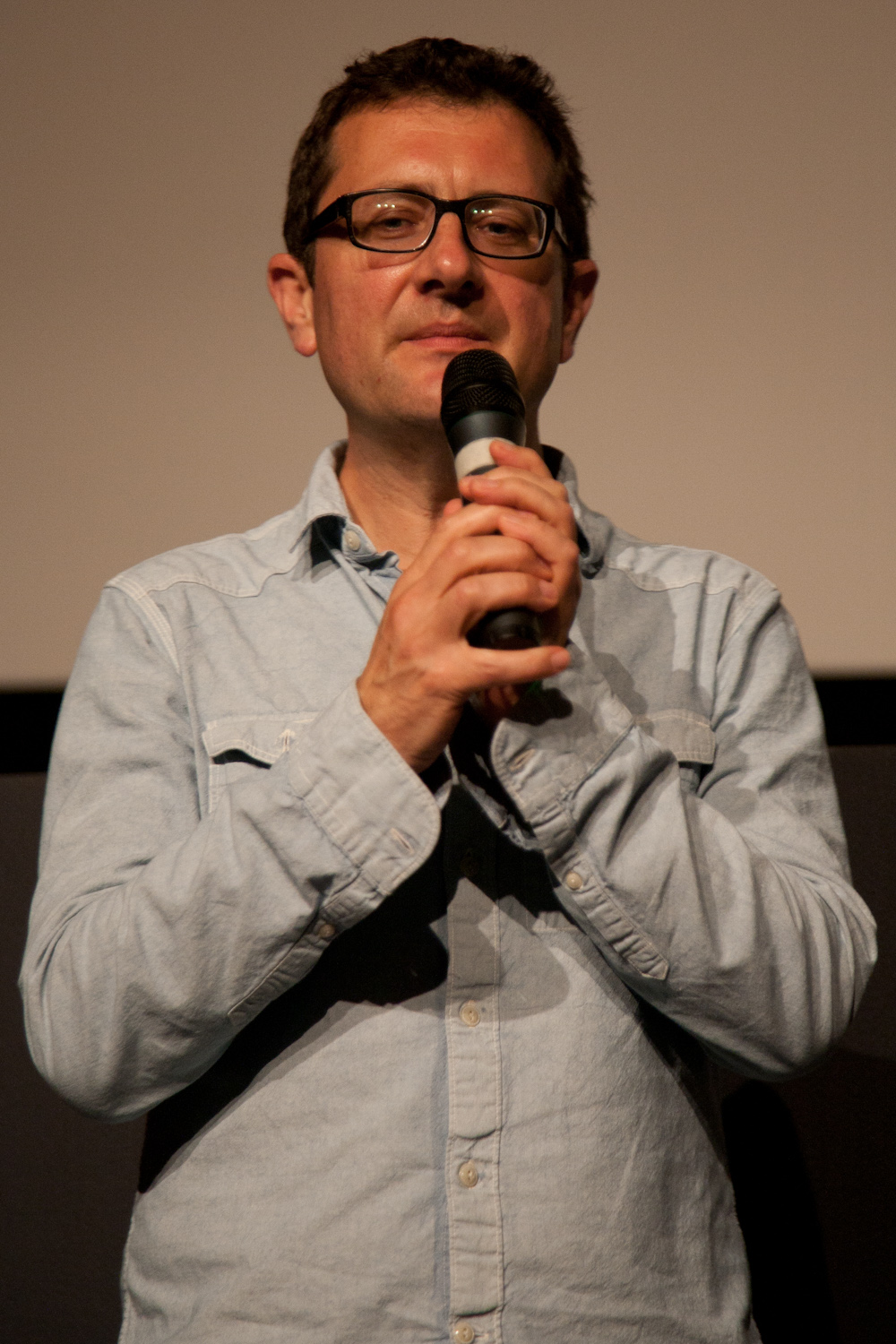
- Rose in October 2010
- Born: 1960 (age 65–66); London, England, UK
- Education: National Film and Television School
- Occupations: Film director, screenwriter, actor, composer, editor
- Years active: 1986–present
- Awards: Golden Brussels Raven; 1988 Paperhouse; 2015 Frankenstein Fantasporto International Fantasy Film Special Jury Award; 1988 Paperhouse Oldenburg German Independence Honorary Award

Bernard Rose (born 1960 in London) is an English filmmaker, considered a pioneer of digital filmmaking. He is best known for directing the horror films Paperhouse (1988) and Candyman (1992), the historical romances Immortal Beloved (1994) and Anna Karenina (1997), and the independent drama Ivans xtc (2000), for which he was nominated for the Independent Spirit Award for Best Director and the John Cassavetes Award. He has also been nominated for the Grand Prix des Amériques and the Venice Horizons Prize. He has frequently cast actors Danny Huston and Tony Todd in his films. In the 1980s, he directed music videos for UB40, Frankie Goes to Hollywood and Bronski Beat.

== Life and career ==
Rose was born in London, the son of a father who was born Jewish and a mother who had converted to Judaism. His mother was a granddaughter of the Earl Jellicoe. He began making super 8 films when he was 9. By 1975, he won an amateur film competition hosted by BBC which led to the broadcasting of his works. He worked for Jim Henson on the last season of The Muppet Show and then again on The Dark Crystal in 1981. He attended National Film and Television School and graduated in 1982 with a Master's in Filmmaking. After this, he moved on to directing music videos for MTV, one of which was the uncensored version of Frankie Goes To Hollywood's hit "Relax".

Shortly after directing music videos, he moved on to direct British TV films such as Prospects and then finally in 1988 directed his first major full-length film, Paperhouse. Rose got his big break internationally with 1992's Candyman, which has since been seen as a cult classic. Subsequently, Rose both wrote and directed Immortal Beloved, about the life and loves of Ludwig van Beethoven, as well as a remake of Leo Tolstoy's Anna Karenina.

In 2012, Rose directed Two Jacks, a drama based on Leo Tolstoy's short story "Two Hussars," starring Sienna Miller and Danny Huston. In the same year, he released Boxing Day, another Tolstoy adaptation with Huston as a lead for a total of four from the pair (following Ivans Xtc and The Kreutzer Sonata). In 2014, Rose directed the musical drama The Devil's Violinist. This was followed by a contemporary adaptation of Mary Shelley's Frankenstein. Rose directed Samurai Marathon (2019) a Japanese-produced historical drama, and the American drama Traveling Light (2021).

In 2023, Rose was announced as the writer/director of Relax, a musical biopic about Frankie Goes to Hollywood, based upon lead singer Holly Johnson's 1994 autobiography A Bone in My Flute, and starring Callum Scott Howells as Johnson. Relax, to be produced by Working Title Films, continues Rose's association with Frankie Goes to Hollywood after directing music videos for the band's songs "Relax" (1983) and "Welcome to the Pleasuredome" (1985).

Rose is a frequent collaborator of actor and filmmaker Danny Huston. Rose is also a contributor to the webseries Trailers from Hell.

== Filmography ==
=== Film ===
Year	Title	Director	Writer	Notes
1986	Smart Money	Yes	No	
1987	Body Contact	Yes	No	
1988	Paperhouse	Yes	No	
1990	Chicago Joe and the Showgirl	Yes	No	
1992	Candyman	Yes	Yes	
1992	Inside Out III	Yes	Yes	Segment: "Cafe L'Amour"
1992	Inside Out IV	Yes	Yes	Segment: "Save the Wetlands"
1994	Immortal Beloved	Yes	Yes	
1997	Anna Karenina	Yes	Yes	
2000	Ivans Xtc	Yes	Yes	
2005	Snuff-Movie	Yes	Yes	Also cinematographer
2008	The Kreutzer Sonata	Yes	Yes	
2010	Mr. Nice	Yes	Yes	
2012	Two Jacks	Yes	Yes	
2012	Boxing Day	Yes	Yes	
2013	Sx_Tape	Yes	No	
2013	The Devil's Violinist	Yes	Yes	
2015	Frankenstein	Yes	Yes	
2019	Samurai Marathon	Yes	Yes	Japanese film
2021	Traveling Light	Yes	Yes	Also producer
TBA	Lear Rex	Yes	Yes	Post-production

=== Television ===
Year	Title	Notes
1986	Prospects	2 episodes

=== Music video ===
Year	Title	Artist
1983	"Red Red Wine"	UB40
1983	"Relax"	Frankie Goes to Hollywood
1984	"Smalltown Boy"	Bronski Beat
1985	"Welcome to the Pleasuredome"	Frankie Goes to Hollywood

== Awards and nominations ==
Year	Title	Award/Nomination
1988	Paperhouse	BIFFF Golden Raven Award; Special Jury Award (Fantasporto); Nominated- Fantasporto International Fantasy Film Award
1992	Candyman	Avoriaz Fantastic Film Festival Audience Award; Avoriaz Fantastic Film Festival Grand Prize; Nominated- Saturn Award for Best Writing; Nominated- Fantasporto International Fantasy Film Award
2000	Ivans Xtc	Nominated for the Independent Spirit Award for Best Director; Nominated for the Independent Spirit John Cassavetes Award
2012	Two Jacks	Nominated for the Hollywood Discovery Award for Best Feature Film; Nominated- Grand Prix des Amériques
2012	Boxing Day	Nominated for the Venice Horizons Prize
2015	Frankenstein	BIFFF Golden Raven Award
