= Danny Huston =

American actor, director and screenwriter (born 1962)

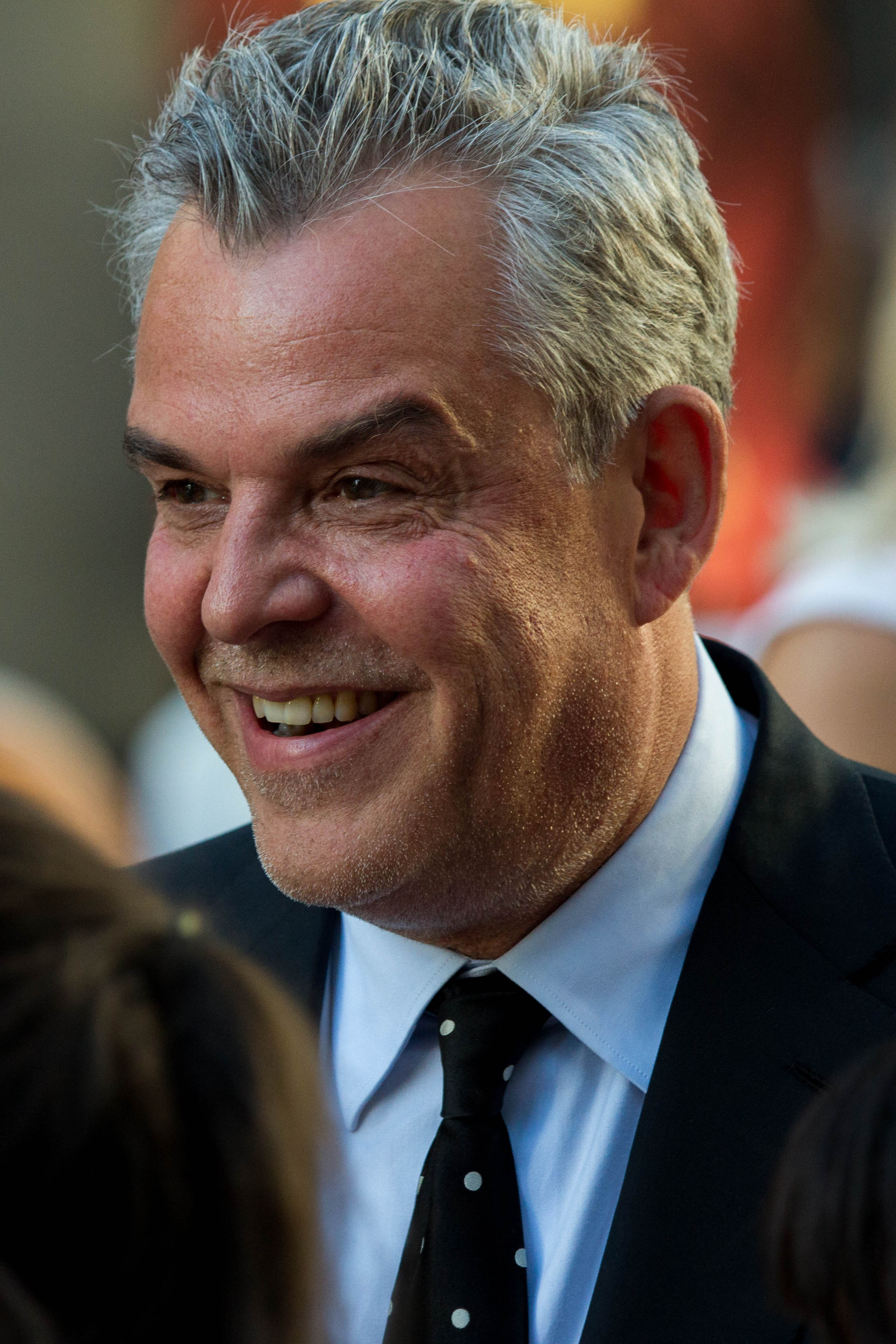
- Huston in 2016
- Born: Daniel Sallis Huston; May 14, 1962 (age 64); Rome, Italy
- Citizenship: United States; United Kingdom
- Education: London Film School
- Occupations: Actor; director; screenwriter
- Years active: 1975–present
- Spouses: Virginia Madsen (m. 1989; div. 1992) Katie Jane Evans (m. 2001; died 2008)
- Children: 1
- Father: John Huston
- Relatives: Tony Huston (half-brother); Anjelica Huston (half-sister); Allegra Huston (adoptive sister); Jack Huston (nephew); Walter Huston (grandfather)

Daniel Sallis Huston (born May 14, 1962) is an American actor, director, and screenwriter. A member of the Huston family of filmmakers, he is the son of director John Huston and half-brother of actress Anjelica Huston.

He is known for his roles in films such as Ivans Xtc (2000), for which he was nominated for an Independent Spirit Award for Best Male Lead, 21 Grams (2003), Birth (2004), The Aviator (also 2004), The Constant Gardener (2005), Marie Antoinette (2006), Children of Men (also 2006), The Kingdom (2007), 30 Days of Night (also 2007), Robin Hood (2010), Hitchcock (2012), The Congress (2013), Big Eyes (2014), Wonder Woman (2017), Game Night (2018), Stan & Ollie (also 2018), and Angel Has Fallen (2019).

Huston portrayed The Axeman on the FX series American Horror Story: Coven and Massimo Dolcefino on American Horror Story: Freak Show. He played Ben "The Butcher" Diamond on Magic City (2012–13), Dan Jenkins in the first two seasons of the Paramount Network drama series Yellowstone (2018–19), Jamie Laird on the second season of Succession (2019), and the voice of Jonas Backstein on the first season of Common Side Effects (2025). His directing credits include the films Mr. North (1988), The Maddening (1995), and The Last Photograph (2017).

== Early life ==
Huston was born May 14, 1962, in Rome, Italy. He is the son of director and actor John Huston and actress Zoe Sallis. Huston was in Italy directing The Bible: In the Beginning..., in which Sallis played Hagar. Through his father, he is the half-brother of Anjelica Huston and Tony Huston. He has two adoptive siblings, Pablo Huston and Allegra Huston. He is the uncle of Jack Huston and grandson of Walter Huston. He is of Canadian, Welsh, Scots-Irish, Scottish and Anglo-Indian descent.

He spent much of his early life in the United Kingdom and Ireland, and maintains British citizenship through his mother. He worked as an assistant to his father during the production of Under the Volcano (1984) and was a second unit director on The Dead (1987). Huston is a graduate of London Film School.

== Career ==
Huston made his acting debut at the age of 12 in the George Kennedy-starring thriller film The "Human" Factor (1975).

In 1988, Huston directed Mr. North, which was an adaptation of Thornton Wilder's Theophilus North. The film was produced by his father, who died before its completion. In 1995, Huston played Bartender #2 in Leaving Las Vegas and directed the film The Maddening.

Huston was nominated for Best Male Performance at the Independent Spirit Awards in 2003 for his performance in the independent film Ivans Xtc.

Huston appeared in Martin Scorsese's The Aviator. The ensemble cast was nominated for a 2004 SAG Award. In 2006, Huston received the Golden Satellite Award for Best Supporting Actor for his performance as Sandy Woodrow in Fernando Meirelles' The Constant Gardener. Huston starred in the Australian western The Proposition.

Huston starred in Alpha Male and Oliver Parker's Fade to Black, in which he played Orson Welles. He starred in The Kreutzer Sonata, which premiered at the 2008 Edinburgh International Film Festival.

His other film credits include Birth, Silver City, Marie Antoinette, The Number 23, The Kingdom, How to Lose Friends & Alienate People, and 30 Days of Night. He portrayed Samuel Adams in the award-winning HBO miniseries John Adams and Colonel William Stryker in X-Men Origins: Wolverine, a prequel to the original trilogy of X-Men films.

Huston has been featured in Boogie Woogie, The Warrior's Way, Edge of Darkness, Clash of the Titans, Robin Hood, You Don't Know Jack, and Medallion.

Huston played gangster Ben "The Butcher" Diamond on Mitch Glazer's Magic City, for which he was nominated for the Golden Globe Award for Best Supporting Actor – Series, Miniseries or Television Film in 2013. He portrayed The Axeman in the FX thriller series American Horror Story: Coven and Massimo Dolcefino in American Horror Story: Freak Show. Huston starred as General Erich Ludendorff in the 2017 film Wonder Woman and as Wade Jennings in Angel Has Fallen.

== Personal life ==
From 1989 to 1993, Huston was married to actress Virginia Madsen. In 2001, he married Katie Jane Evans with whom he has a daughter. Huston and Evans separated in 2006. Evans died by suicide in October 2008 before the divorce was finalized.

== Filmography ==
=== Film ===
Year	Title	Role	Notes
1975	The "Human" Factor	Mark Kinsdale	Credited as 'Danny Houston'
1988	Mr. North	—N/a	As director
1991	Becoming Colette	—N/a	As director
1995	The Maddening	—N/a	As director
1995	Leaving Las Vegas	Bartender	
1997	Anna Karenina	Stiva	
1998	Spanish Fly	John	
1998	Susan's Plan	Gambler	
1999	Rockin' Good Times	Jimmy's Manager	
2000	Timecode	Randy	
2000	Ivans Xtc	Ivan Beckman	
2001	Eden	Kalman	
2001	Hotel	Hotel Manager	
2002	Torture TV	Gary Silverman	
2002	The Bacchae	Herdsman	
2003	21 Grams	Michael	
2004	Silver City	Danny O'Brien	
2004	Birth	Joseph	
2004	The Aviator	Jack Frye	
2005	The Proposition	Arthur Burns	
2005	The Constant Gardener	Sandy Woodrow	
2006	Marie Antoinette	Joseph II, Holy Roman Emperor	
2006	Alpha Male	Jim Ferris	
2006	Children of Men	Nigel	
2006	Fade to Black	Orson Welles	
2007	The Number 23	Isaac French / Dr. Miles Phoenix	
2007	I Really Hate My Job	Al Bowlly / Himself	
2007	The Kingdom	Gideon Young	
2007	30 Days of Night	Marlow	
2008	The Kreutzer Sonata	Edgar	
2008	How to Lose Friends & Alienate People	Lawrence Maddox	
2009	X-Men Origins: Wolverine	William Stryker	
2009	Boogie Woogie	Art Spindle	
2010	Edge of Darkness	Jack Bennett	
2010	Clash of the Titans	Poseidon	
2010	The Warrior's Way	The Colonel	
2010	Robin Hood	Richard the Lionheart	
2010	The Conspirator	Joseph Holt	
2011	A Monster in Paris	Préfet Maynott	Voice, English dub
2011	Playoff	Max Stoller	
2012	Two Jacks	Jack	
2012	Wrath of the Titans	Poseidon	
2012	Stolen	Agent Tim Harlend	
2012	Hitchcock	Whitfield Cook	
2012	Boxing Day	Basil	
2013	The Congress	Jeff	
2013	Justice League: The Flashpoint Paradox	Sam Lane	Voice
2014	Big Eyes	Dick Nolan	
2014	Tigers	Alex	
2014	The Liberator	Martin Torkington	
2015	Pressure	Engel	
2015	Frankenstein	Viktor Frankenstein	
2016	All I See Is You	Dr. Hughes	
2017	The Last Photograph	Tom Hammond	Also director
2017	Newness	Larry Bejerano	
2017	Wonder Woman	Gen. Erich Ludendorff	
2018	Game Night	Donald Anderton	
2018	The Professor	Peter	
2018	Stan & Ollie	Hal Roach	
2019	Io	Dr. Henry Walden	
2019	Angel Has Fallen	Wade Jennings	
2019	Samurai Marathon	Matthew C. Perry	
2021	Traveling Light	Harry	
2022	Across the River and into the Trees	Capt. Wes O'Neill	
2022	We Are Gathered Here Today	Peter Stone	
2022	Ride Above	Monsieur Cooper	
2022	Life Upside Down	Paul Hasselberg	
2022	Marlowe	Floyd Hanson	
2023	Consecration	Father Romero	
2023	The Dead Don't Hurt	Rudolph Schiller	
2023	I Told You So (Te l’avevo detto)	Father Bill	
2024	Horizon: An American Saga – Chapter 1	Colonel Houghton	
2024	The Crow	Vincent Roeg	
2024	Horizon: An American Saga – Chapter 2	Colonel Houghton	
2025	The Naked Gun	Richard Cane	
2025	Icefall	Rhodes	
2026	Diamond	Bruce Tenenbaum	
2027	A Place in Hell †	TBA	Post-production
TBA	The Riders †	TBA	Post-production
TBA	Lear Rex †	Duke of Albany	Post-production
TBA	Empire City †	Charles Clybourn	Post-production
TBA	The Price of Peace †	General Groves	Filming

Key
†	Denotes films that have not yet been released

=== Television ===
Year	Title	Role	Notes
1987	Mister Corbett's Ghost	—N/a	Director only; television film
1987	Bigfoot	—N/a	Director only; television film
1996	The Ice Princess	—N/a	Director only; television film
2004	CSI: Crime Scene Investigation	Ty Caulfield	Episode: "Suckers"
2006	Covert One: The Hades Factor	Frank Klein	2 episodes
2008	John Adams	Samuel Adams	3 episodes
2010	You Don't Know Jack	Geoffrey Fieger	Television film
2012–2013	Magic City	Ben "The Butcher" Diamond	16 episodes
2013–2014	American Horror Story: Coven	The Axeman of New Orleans	7 episodes
2014	Masters of Sex	Dr. Douglas Greathouse	3 episodes
2014–2015	American Horror Story: Freak Show	Dr. Feinbloom (voice only) and Massimo Dolcefino	3 episodes
2016	Paranoid	Nick Waingrow	4 episodes
2018–2019	Yellowstone	Dan Jenkins	17 episodes
2019	Succession	Jamie Laird	6 episodes
2019	Doc Martin	Robert Brooke	Episode: "Wild West Country"
2020	Red Bird Lane	Hugh	Unaired pilot
2021	Calls	Frank	Voice; episode: "The Universe Did It"
2025	Common Side Effects	Jonas Backstein	Voice; 5 episodes
2025	The Artist	Edgar Degas	6 episodes

== Awards and nominations ==
Institution	Year	Category	Nominated work	Result
Chlotrudis Awards	2007	Best Supporting Actor	The Proposition	Nominated
Edinburgh International Film Festival	2017	Best Film	The Last Photograph	Nominated
Golden Globe Awards	2013	Best Supporting Actor – Series, Miniseries or Television Film	Magic City	Nominated
Independent Spirit Awards	2003	Best Male Lead	Ivans Xtc	Nominated
Monte-Carlo Television Festival	2008	Outstanding Actor in a Miniseries	John Adams	Nominated
Montreal World Film Festival	2011	Best Actor	Playoff	Won
Satellite Awards	2005	Best Supporting Actor – Motion Picture	The Constant Gardener	Won
Screen Actors Guild Awards	2005	Outstanding Performance by a Cast in a Motion Picture	The Aviator	Nominated
Saturn Awards	2014	Best Guest Starring Role on Television	American Horror Story: Coven	Nominated
Toronto Film Critics Association Awards	2006	Best Supporting Actor	The Proposition	Nominated
