= Macrogen =

Macrogen, Inc.
- Type: Public
- Traded as: KRX: 038290
- Founded: 1997
- Founder: Jeong-sun Seo
- Headquarters: Seoul, South Korea
- Area served: Global
- Key people: 김창훈 Changhoon Kim (CEO)
- Products: DNA sequencing; Bioinformatic analysis
- Divisions: Macrogen Korea; Macrogen Japan; Macrogen Oceania; Macrogen Singapore; Macrogen Spain
- Subsidiaries: Macrogen Europe BV; Psomagen Inc.
- Website: www.macrogen.com

Macrogen, Inc. is a South Korean public biotechnology company. The company's headquarters are located in Seoul. The company was founded in 1997 by Jeong-sun Seo, a professor at Seoul National University. It was venture capital-backed until its initial public offering (IPO) and subsequent listing on the KOSDAQ market in 2000, making it the first Korean biotechnology firm to raise funds through an IPO. The company announced plans in 2010 to map the "Korean genome" based on the notion that United States-backed genome mapping efforts up to that time were representative of the "Caucasian genome" rather than the "Human genome" as claimed. By 2015, the company was described by one news outlet as "a global leader in personalized genomic medicine".

== Business model ==
Macrogen's business model focuses on providing research services to other firms engaged in biotechnology research and development. As of 2005, 50% of the firm's revenue was derived from DNA sequencing services. Prior to its 2000 IPO, the company aimed to be the low-cost leader in providing research services; after the IPO, Macrogen turned to DNA sequencing technology development as a way to distinguish itself from competitors.

Consistent with the post-IPO competitive technology strategy was Macrogen's being among the first customers to purchase a HiSeq X Ten System from Illumina in January 2014, purported to be the first sequencing system to enable cracking the $1,000 genome boundary.

Macrogen operates worldwide through a network of branch offices and subsidiaries. In 2004, it founded Macrogen Corp. in the US, which in 2019 became Psomagen Inc. In 2008, it established its first European branch office in Amsterdam, which in 2017 became a subsidiary, Macrogen Europe BV.

== Corporate governance ==
As of 2014, HyungTae Kim held the role of chief executive officer (CEO) at Macrogen. By early 2015, however, the CEO role had been filled by Hyon-yong Chong.

With respect to the company's Board, founder Jeong-sun Seo remained Chairman as of 2015.

According to KOSDAQ statistics, over 90% of the company's outstanding stock is held by individual investors.

== Strategic and tactical relationships ==
In late 2014, Macrogen licensed Clarity LIMS from GenoLogics, a system "built specifically for the needs of clinical or research genomics and mass spec laboratories". Initial integration with service offerings was to be through the USA-based Macrogen Clinical Laboratory.

In 2014 and 2015, Macrogen won competitive bidding rounds to provide genome analysis services to the University College London.
