= Cron (disambiguation) =

Cron is a time-based job scheduler in Unix-like computer operating systems.

CRON or cron may also refer to:

== People ==
- Emmanuel Macron, French president
- Chris Cron (born 1964), American baseball manager
- Claudia Cron, American actress and model
- C. J. Cron (born 1990), American professional baseball player
- Kevin Cron (born 1993), American professional baseball player

== Other uses ==
- CRON-diet, the Calorie Restriction with Optimal Nutrition diet
- Cron, a character in the animated series Teen Titans
- Cron, a calendar software by Cron Inc., now Notion Calendar

== See also ==
- Cronin (Old Irish crón), a surname (and a list of people with the name)
- CronLab, a computer company
- Crohn's disease, a type of inflammatory bowel disease
