= Brian Delaney =

Brian Delaney may refer to:

- Brian Delaney, drummer for the New York Dolls
- Brian Manning Delaney (born 1965), philosopher and writer
- Brian T. Delaney, American voice actor
