= $1,000 genome =

Era of predictive and personalized medicine

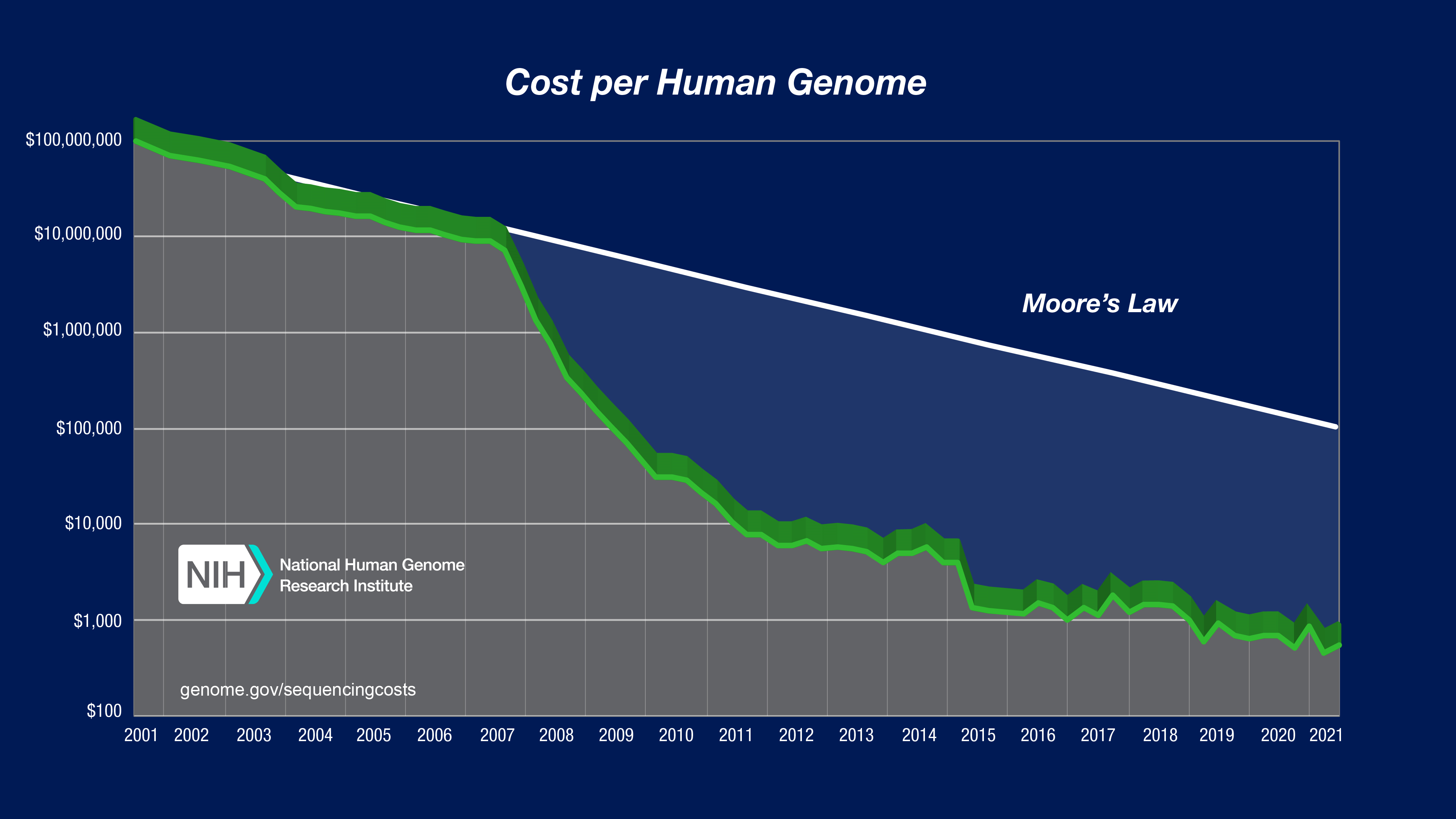
Evolution of the cost of sequencing a human genome from 2001 to 2021.

The $1,000 genome refers to an era of predictive and personalized medicine during which the cost of fully sequencing an individual's genome (WGS) is roughly one thousand USD. It is also the title of a book by British science writer and founding editor of Nature Genetics, Kevin Davies. By late 2015, the cost to generate a high-quality "draft" whole human genome sequence was just below $1,500.

== History ==
The "$1,000 genome" catchphrase was first publicly recorded in December 2001 at a scientific retreat to discuss the future of biomedical research following publication of the first draft of the Human Genome Project (HGP), convened by the National Human Genome Research Institute at Airlie House in Virginia. The phrase neatly highlighted the chasm between the actual cost of the Human Genome Project, estimated at $2.7 billion over a decade, and the benchmark for routine, affordable personal genome sequencing.

On 2 October 2002, Craig Venter introduced the opening session of GSAC (The Genome Sequencing and Analysis Conference) at the Hynes Convention Center in Boston: "The Future of Sequencing: Advancing Towards the $1,000 Genome." Speakers included George M. Church and executives from 454 Life Sciences, Solexa, U.S. Genomics, VisiGen and Amersham plc. In 2003, Venter announced that his foundation would earmark $500,000 for a breakthrough leading to the $1,000 genome. That sum was subsequently rolled into the Archon X Prize.

In October 2004, NHGRI introduced the first in a series of '$1,000 Genome' grants designed to advance "the development of breakthrough technologies that will enable a human-sized genome to be sequenced for $1,000 or less."

In a January 2006 article in Scientific American making the case for the Personal Genome Project, George M. Church wrote

The "$1,000 genome" has become shorthand for the promise of DNA-sequencing capability made so affordable that individuals might think the once-in-a-lifetime expenditure to have a full personal genome sequence read to a disk for doctors to reference is worthwhile.

In 2007, the journal Nature Genetics invited dozens of scientists to respond to its 'Question of the Year':

The sequencing of the equivalent of an entire human genome for $1,000 has been announced as a goal for the genetics community... What would you do if [the $1,000 genome was] available immediately?

In May 2007, during a ceremony held at Baylor College of Medicine, 454 Life Sciences founder Jonathan Rothberg presented James D. Watson with a digital copy of his personal genome sequence on a portable hard drive. Rothberg estimated the cost of the sequence—the first personal genome produced using a next-generation sequencing platform—at $1 million. Watson's genome sequence was published in 2008.

A number of scientists have highlighted the cost of additional analysis after performing sequencing. Bruce Korf, past president of the American College of Medical Genetics, described "the $1-million interpretation." Washington University's Elaine Mardis prefers "the $100,000 analysis."

== Commercial efforts ==
At the end of 2007, the biotech company Knome debuted the first direct-to-consumer genome sequencing service at an initial price of $350,000 (including analysis). One of the first clients was Dan Stoicescu, a Swiss-based biotech entrepreneur. As the costs of sequencing continued to plummet, in 2008, Illumina announced that it had sequenced an individual genome for $100,000 in reagent costs. Applied Biosystems countered by saying the cost on its platform was $60,000. Pacific Biosciences became the latest entrant in what The New York Times called "a heated race for the '$1,000 genome'". In 2009, Stanford University professor Stephen Quake published a paper sequencing his own genome on an instrument built by Helicos Biosciences (a company he co-founded) for a reported cost in consumables of $48,000. That same year, Complete Genomics debuted its proprietary whole-genome sequencing service for researchers, charging as little as $5,000/genome for bulk orders.

In 2010, Illumina introduced its individual genome sequencing service for consumers, who were required to present a doctor's note. The initial price was $50,000/person. One of the first clients was former Solexa CEO John West, who had his entire family of four sequenced. In January 2012, Life Technologies unveiled a new sequencing instrument, the Ion Proton Sequencer, which it said would achieve the $1,000 genome in a day within 12 months.

In January 2014, Illumina launched its HiSeq X Ten Sequencer, claiming to have produced the first $1,000 genome at 30× coverage. Some researchers hailed the HiSeq X Ten's release as a milestone – Michael Schatz of Cold Spring Harbor Laboratory said that "it is a major human accomplishment on par with the development of the telescope or the microprocessor". However, critics pointed out that the $10 million upfront investment required to purchase the system would deter customers. Furthermore, the $1,000 genome cost calculation left out overheads, such as the cost of powering the machine.

In September 2015, Veritas Genetics (co-founded by George Church) announced $1,000 full-genome sequencing including interpretation for participants in the Personal Genome Project.

In April 2017, the newly formed European company Dante Labs started offering the WGS for $900.

In 2017, Beijing Genomics Institute began offering WGS for $600.

In July 2018, on Amazon Prime Day, Dante Labs offered it for $349.

In November 2018, around the time of Black Friday, Dante Labs offered WGS for the first time less than $200, and Veritas Genetics for two days for the same price of $199 offered WGS limited to a thousand customers. In March of the same year, geneticist Matthew Hurles of Wellcome Sanger Institute noted that the private companies, including Illumina, are currently competing to reach a new target for WGS of only $100.

On 18 February 2020, Nebula Genomics announced that has partnered up with BGI Group to start offering 30x WGS for $299.

== Archon Genomics X PRIZE ==
It was originally announced that the revamped Archon Genomics X PRIZE presented by Medco would hold a $10-million grand prize competition in January 2013 for the team that reaches (or comes closest to reaching) the $1,000 genome. The grand prize would go to "the team(s) able to sequence 100 human genomes within 30 days to an accuracy of 1 error per 1,000,000 bases, with 98% completeness, identification of insertions, deletions and rearrangements, and a complete haplotype, at an audited total cost of $1,000 per genome." In August 2013, the Archon Genomics X PRIZE was cancelled, as the founders felt it had been "Outpaced by Innovation," and "was not incentivizing the technological changes".

== Additional resources ==
- Webcast of James Watson personal genome presentation, 31 May 2007. https://web.archive.org/web/20120206220653/http://www.bcm.edu/news/packages/watson_genome.cfm
