= TellmeGen =

Commercial genetic testing company

Genelink, S.L.
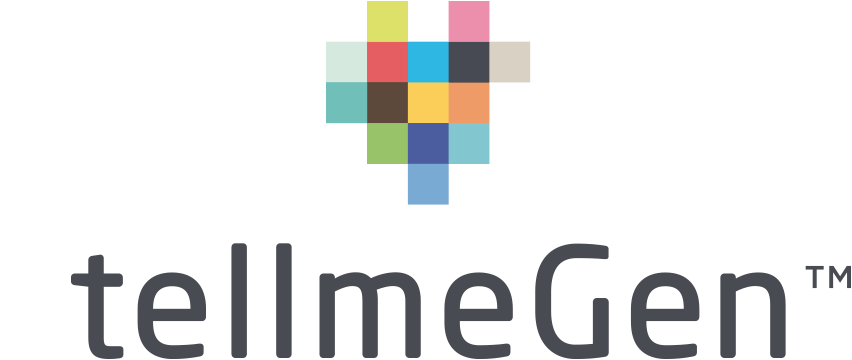
- Trade name: tellmeGen
- Type: Sociedad Limitada (S.L.)
- Industry: Personal genomics
- Founded: July 4, 2014
- Headquarters: Valencia, Spain
- Area served: International
- Brands: TellmeGen, Your Healthmap, Genelink
- Revenue: ▲€3M – €6M (2025)
- Number of employees: 30 (2025)
- Website: www.tellmegen.com/en/

TellmeGen is a Spanish commercial genetic testing company. Their legal consent document lists the name Genelink, S.L.

As of February 2023, the company's website listed contact information for Spain, the US, the UK, Germany, Italy, Mexico, Brazil, Peru, Panama, Colombia, Kazakhstan, the UAE, Australia and Saudi Arabia. The default website is in Spanish but is available in other languages. TellmeGen says it follows General Data Protection Regulation, which is an EU regulation for data privacy.
