= Food steamer =

Kitchen appliance

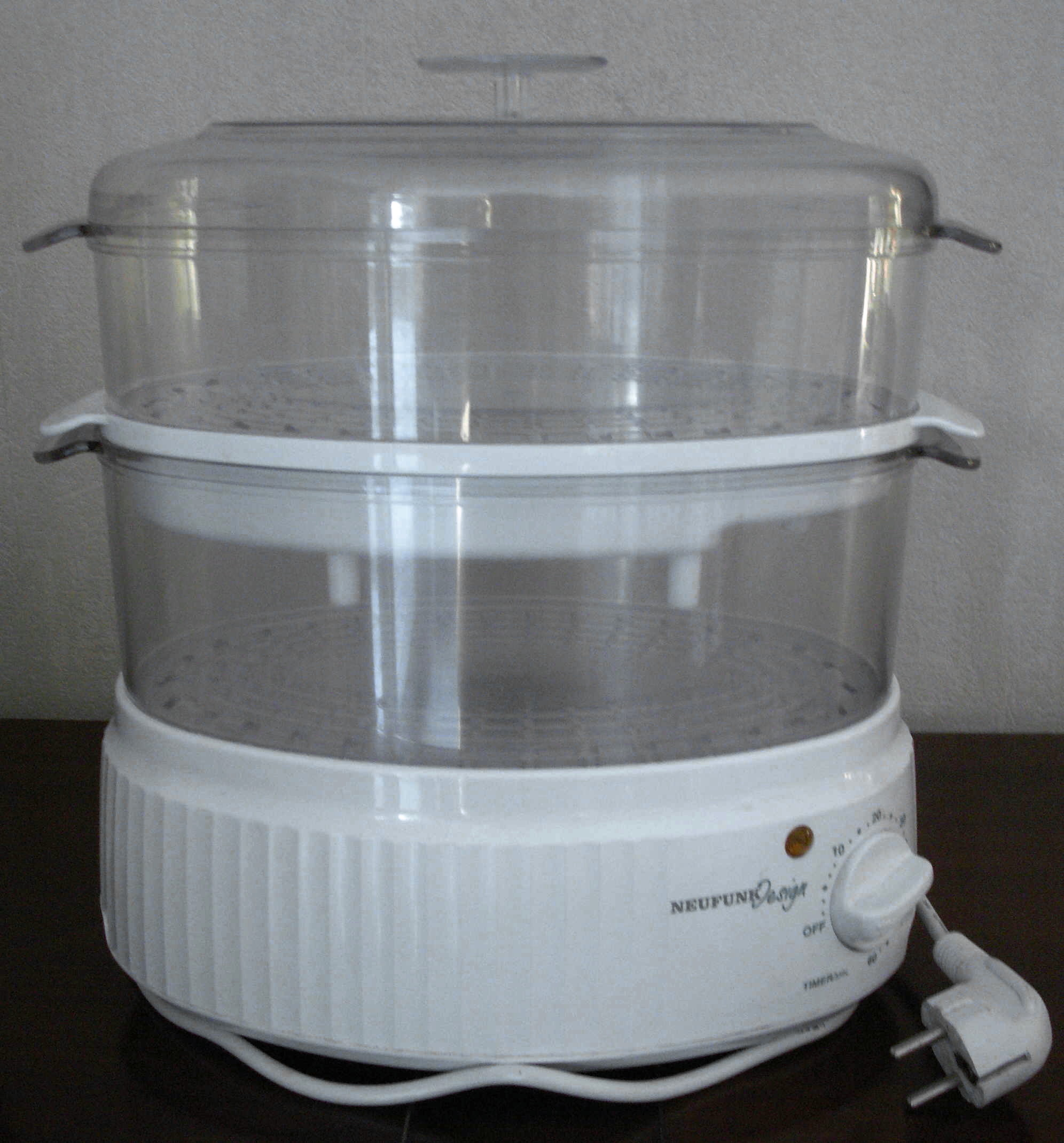
An electric steam cooker

A food steamer or steam cooker is a small kitchen appliance used to cook or prepare various foods with steam heat by means of holding the food in a closed vessel reducing steam escape. This manner of cooking is called steaming.

== History ==
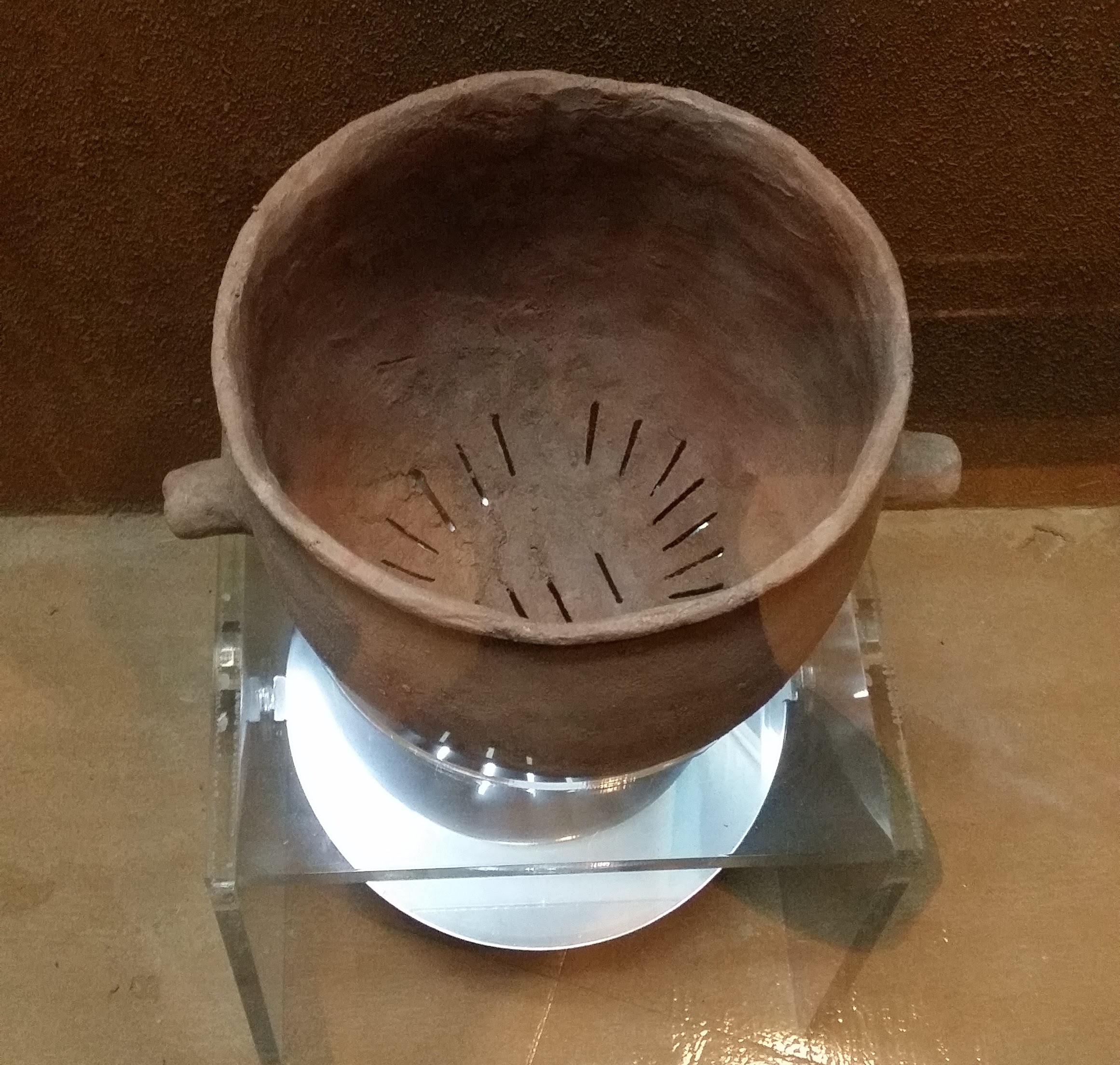
A Bronze Age siru (traditional Korean steamer)

Food steamers have been used for millennia. In ancient China, pottery steamers were used to cook food. Archaeological excavations have uncovered pottery cooking vessels known as yan steamers: a yan was composed of two vessels, a zeng with a perforated floor surmounted on a pot or caldron with a tripod base and a top cover. The earliest yan steamer dating from about 5000 BC was unearthed in the Banpo site. In the lower Yangzi River, zeng pots first appeared in the Hemudu culture (5000–4500 BC) and Liangzhu culture (3200–2000 BC) and were used to steam rice; yan steamers were also unearthed in several Liangzhu sites, including three found at the Chuodun and Luodun sites in southern Jiangsu. In the Longshan culture (3000–2000 BC) site at Tianwang in western Shandong, three large yan steamers were discovered.

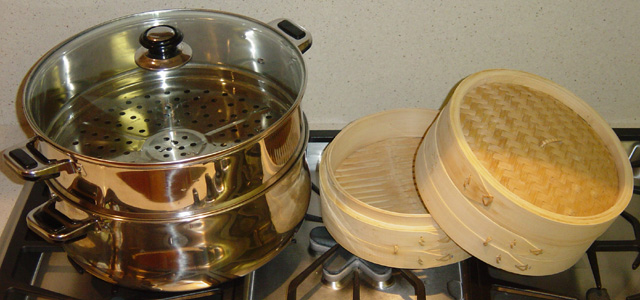
A modern metal steamer and a bamboo steamer

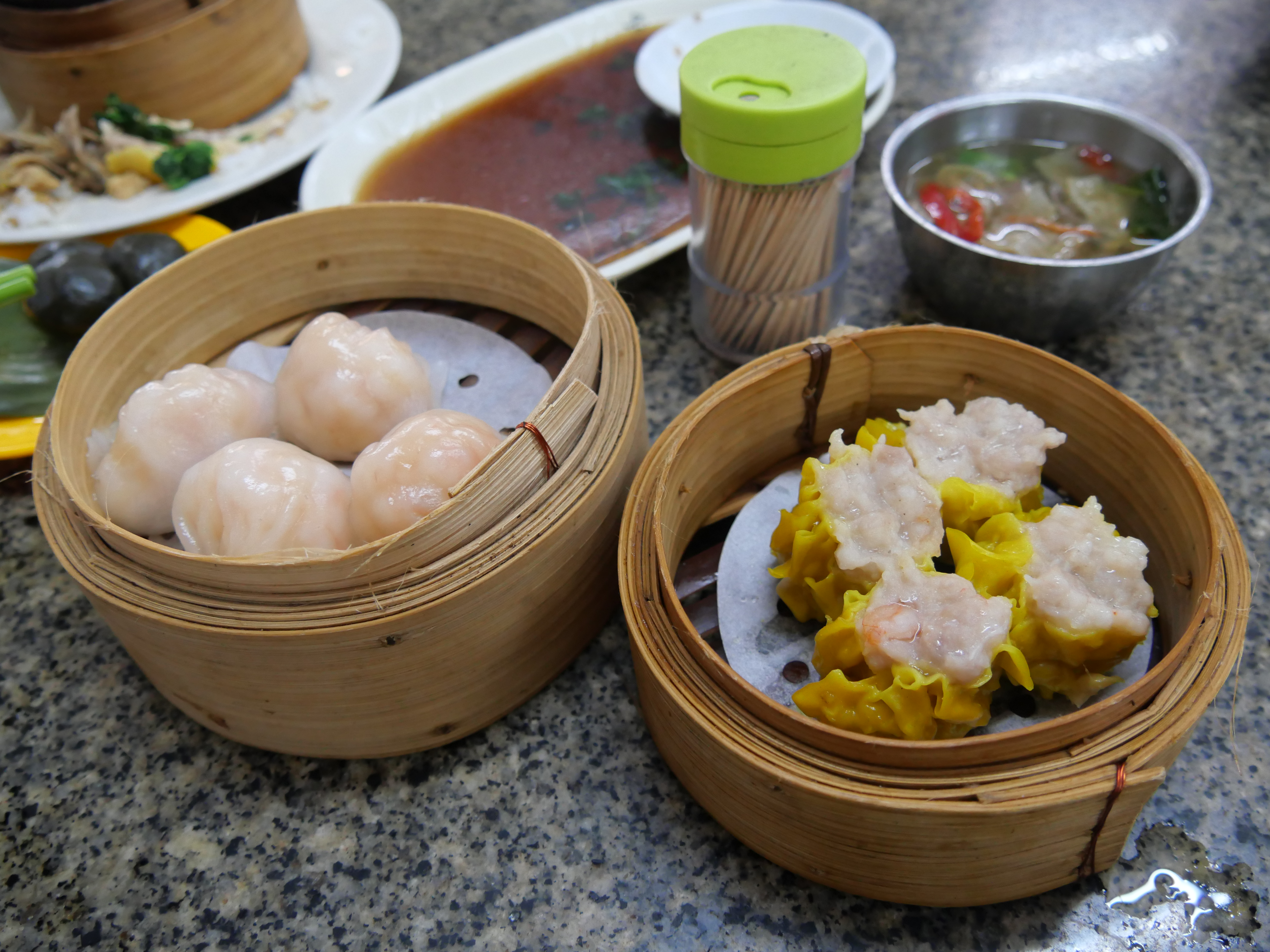
Har gow and shumai, two common dim sum dishes cooked in steamers

== Advantages ==
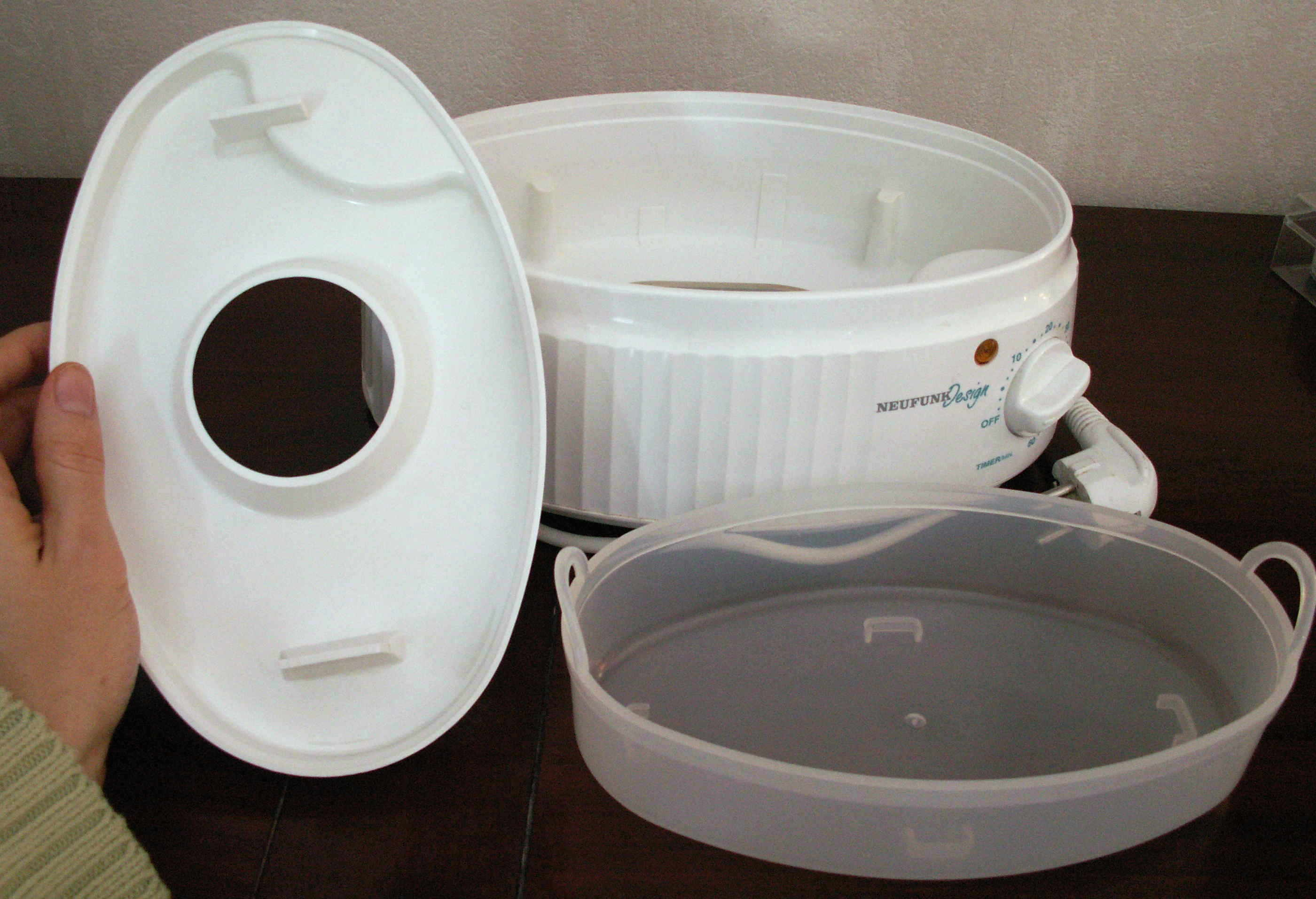
A steam cooker catchment which collects water with condensed nutrients

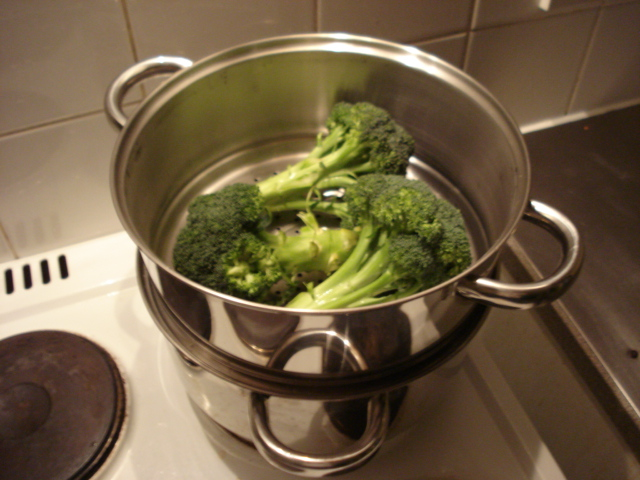
Broccoli in a metal steamer pot

Most steam cookers also feature a juice catchment which allows all nutrients (otherwise lost as steam) to be consumed. When other cooking techniques are used (e.g., boiling), these nutrients are generally lost, as most are discarded after cooking.

Due to their health aspect (cooking without any oil), food steamers are used extensively in health-oriented diets such as cuisine minceur, some raw food diets, the Okinawa diet, a macrobiotic diet, or the CRON-diet.

Food steamers release less heat to the kitchen environment, therefore helping keep the kitchen cool during hot summers.

== See also ==
- Food processing
- List of cooking appliances
- List of cooking vessels
- List of steamed foods
- Bamboo steamer
- Pressure cooking
- Rice cooker, a cooking appliance that may have a food steaming capability
- Siru, earthenware steamer
