= Nebula Genomics =

American company

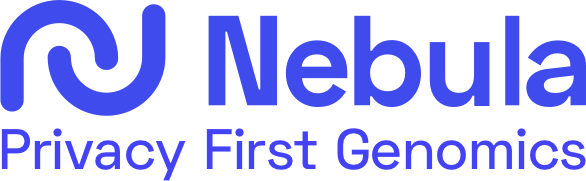
- Type: Private
- Industry: Biotechnology; Personal Genomics
- Founded: 2018
- Founder: George Church; Dennis Grishin; Kamal Obbad
- Headquarters: San Francisco, California
- Services: Genetic testing Whole-genome sequencing
- Parent: ProPhase Labs
- Website: www.nebula.org

Nebula Genomics is a personal genomics company based in San Francisco, California. It offers a whole-genome sequencing service.

== History ==
Nebula Genomics was co-founded in 2018 by George Church, geneticist at Harvard Medical School. In August 2018, the company announced a seed funding round of $4.3 million led by Khosla Ventures. In February 2020, Nebula Genomics began offering high-coverage whole-genome sequencing for $299 internationally. The service also requires a subscription to Nebula Explore.

On 11 August 2021, ProPhase Labs, a diversified medical science and technology company, announced the acquisition of Nebula Genomics by its recently formed subsidiary, ProPhase Precision Medicine, Inc., for about $14.6 million in a combination of ProPhase Labs common stock and cash.

In 2024, Nebula's parent company, ProPhase Labs, expanded its genomics segment by forming a new subsidiary, DNA Complete, Inc. DNA Complete, which launched in November 2024, offers a direct-to-consumer genetic testing service. ProPhase Labs stated that the new service utilizes Nebula Genomics' laboratory, in addition to other labs, for its sample sequencing.

== Privacy concerns ==
=== Relationship with BGI Group ===
BGI Group is a Chinese life sciences company that has been part of many controversies, especially regarding genetic data. One of these concerns one of the most popular prenatal test in the world, Reuters found out that it has been developed with the involvement of Chinese's army, People's Liberation Army (PLA), and has been used to collect genetic data from millions of women. George Church, the co-founder of Nebula Genomics, has served on the BGI Group's scientific advisory board since 2007. In 2017, BGI established the George Church Institute of Regenesis, a research collaboration between Church's lab and about a dozen staffers at BGI in China.

On 18 February 2020, Nebula Genomics also announced that it had partnered up with BGI: saliva samples sent for decoding to Nebula Genomics are sent by the company to BGI labs in Hong Kong for sequencing.

In 2022, the company stated in its FAQs that the samples are sequenced in Europe. However, in 2023 no specific statement of sequencing location exists in the FAQs. Nebula Genomics said that this partnership is made to bring down the cost of whole-genome sequencing since normally it has a cost that makes it inaccessible to most people.

=== Data to third parties ===
Both Nebula and BGI use MGI DNBSeq, which is a DNA sequencing technology method. This method is cheaper than Illumina dye sequencing. However, this cost difference alone does not fully explain the much lower prices offered by these companies compared to their competitors using Illumina methods. File availability is also similar across companies. Therefore, it has been hypothesized that the lower costs offered by Nebula Genomics and BGI Group may also reflect differences in laboratory practices or the extent of downstream applications and use of consumer data, which could include the sale of genetic data to third parties.

The sharing of personal data with third parties was stated in the privacy policy of Nebula Genomics, which said: "We may use personal data in our possession to create de-identified and aggregated data sets. [...] We may then use this aggregate data for any purposes or disclose it to third parties for their purposes in accordance with applicable laws.". However, fully anonymized genetic data can still be identifiable.

==== Portillo v. Nebula Genomics ====
In October 2024, a class-action lawsuit, Portillo v. Nebula Genomics, Inc., was filed in the U.S. District Court for the Northern District of Illinois. The suit alleged that Nebula violated the Illinois Genetic Information Privacy Act (GIPA) by improperly sharing customers’ genetic information, such as predisposition to certain diseases or hormone levels, with third parties, including co-defendants Meta Platforms, Google, and Microsoft, without written consent.

The case was later transferred to the U.S. District Court for the District of Massachusetts, based on a forum selection clause in Nebula's Terms of Use. The Illinois court noted in its ruling that the plaintiff would have been aware of the company's privacy policy regarding third-party data sharing. Following the transfer, Meta, Google, and Microsoft were reportedly provisionally no longer part of the suit. As of October 2025, the complaint remained at the pleading stage, and Nebula had filed a motion to dismiss.

=== Use by law enforcement and risk of data breaches ===
Nebula Genomics says that it is developing its own blockchain to enforce security and privacy but, despite that, re-identification of people starting from the genetic data could still be possible (DNA itself is a unique identifier), law enforcement could still issue search warrants or subpoena the data, and difficulties related to encrypting whole genomes mean that this technology could still be vulnerable to data breaches. This is also stated in Nebula Genomics' Privacy Policy: "However, under certain circumstances your genetic information may be subject to processing pursuant to laws, regulations or judicial or governmental orders, warrants or subpoenas. In other words, a lawful demand by public authorities may require we share your personal Information", they also state that: "We may share your personal data if we believe it is reasonably necessary to enforce the Nebula Terms and Conditions, protect the security and integrity of our Services, or protect the rights, safety, or property of Nebula, our employees or users". About data breaches risk it's written that: "While we cannot guarantee that loss, access or misuse of data will not occur, we use reasonable efforts to prevent these outcomes."

== Technology ==
Nebula Genomics develops technologies to enable controllable, transparent and secure genomic data sharing. It is also developing approaches for privacy-preserving analysis of genomic datasets.

== Awards ==
In 2019, the company won the "Best-in-Show" award at the SXSW Pitch competition, part of the South by Southwest festival.
