= Fina Kurreeman =

Mauritian-Dutch scientist

Fina A. S. Kurreeman
- Born: Mauritius
- Education: University of Westminster (BA); Leiden University (PhD)
- Awards: UNESCO-L'oréal For Women in Science International Fellowships (2009)
- Scientific career
- Fields: Rheumatology, Immunology, Medical Genetics
- Workplaces: Leiden University Medical Center

Fina Kurreeman is a Mauritian-Dutch medical geneticist and professor of rheumatology at the Leiden University Medical Center. Kurreeman has authored 52 papers and received more than 6000 citations for her work in the genetic basis of Inflammatory disorders, in particular studying the role of non-coding RNA in disease pathologies. She was awarded a 2011 Leiden University Medical Center Fellowship.

== Education ==
Kureeman completed her postdoc between the Harvard Medical School Brigham and Women's Hospital and the Broad Institute, in the laboratory of George Church.

== Career and advocacy ==
Kurreeman's recent work focuses on investigating the role of long non-coding RNAs in fibrosis and sclerosis.

In 2020, Kurreeman advocated for international support for Mauritius in the wake of the MV Wakashio oil spill, noting the biomedical potential of biodiversity and how such climate disasters can threaten future research. She referenced in particular that many ongoing drug development projects depend on biomolecules recovered from environments such as those ecologies threatened by the oil spill, stressing the importance of biobanking and sequencing projects.

== Prices and recognitions ==
- 2009 - UNESCO-L’Oréal For Women in Science International Fellowships
