= Spam Cube =

New York City tech startup company

- Company type: Private
- Industry: Information Technology
- Founded: 2005
- Founder: Joseph P. Marino, Jonathan Fortin
- Headquarters: 590 Madison Avenue, 21st Floor, New York, NY, United States
- Key people: David J. Soares
- Products: SaaS Networking Products
- Website: www.spamcube.com

Spam Cube, Inc was a high-tech startup company based in the midtown area of New York City. The company invented and manufactured the Spam Cube, a SaaS (Security As A Service) network security hardware device for consumers that blocked spam e-mail, computer viruses and phishing. The company invented a SaaS delivery platform technology that enables any home networking embedded device such as a Broadband cable modem, DSL modem, Wireless router or Femtocell to offer network Security As A Service technology that blocks spam e-mail, computer viruses and phishing. The Spam Cube SaaS platform gave the consumer the choice to select spam e-mail, computer viruses, and phishing blocking technology that was powered by either McAfee or Symantec managed enterprise Security As A Service technology.

== Trademark issues ==
In May 2006, the company ran into a costly legal battle with Hormel Foods over its trademark "Spam Cube". Hormel Foods claimed that the company's "Spam Cube" brand name was causing confusion amongst consumers and that consumers were not able to tell the difference between the Spam Cube, a cube-shaped home network security device, and Hormel's cube-shaped SPAM canned meat product. In February 2008, the company won the legal battle against Hormel Foods in the United States. The SPAM trademark dispute was widely publicized since the dispute would have forced the company into bankruptcy had Hormel Foods won.

== Competitors ==
Three years after Spam Cube released its technology, Cisco Systems teamed up with Trend Micro to manufacture the Linksys Home Network Defender. Linksys and Trend Micro competed directly with Spam Cube for market share in the embedded device SaaS market.

== See also ==
- Anti-spam appliances
