= George Church (geneticist) =

American geneticist (born 1954)

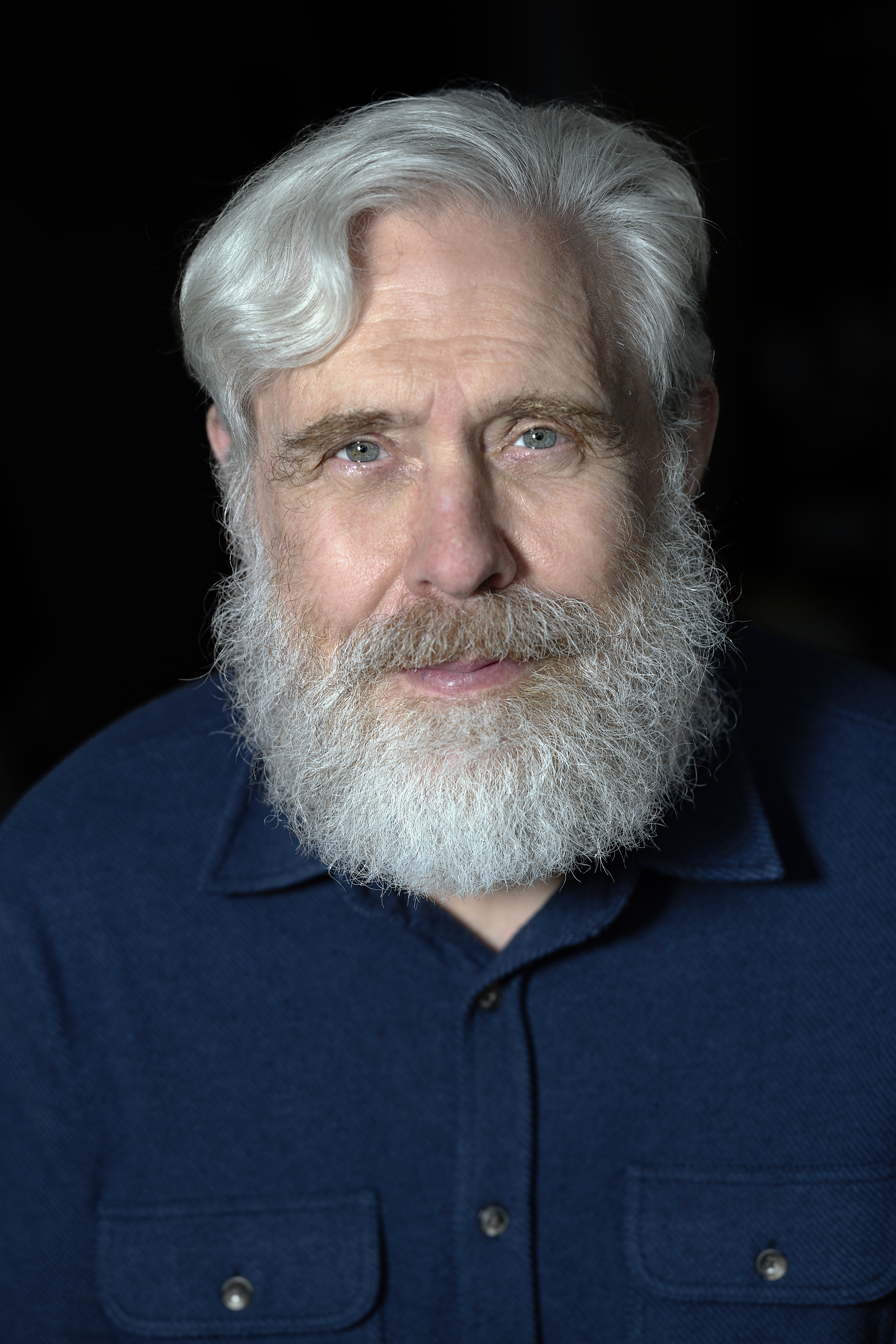
- Church in 2023
- Born: George McDonald Church; August 28, 1954 (age 72); MacDill Air Force Base, Tampa, Florida, U.S.
- Education: Duke University (BS); Harvard University (PhD)
- Known for: Synthetic Biology, Woolly Mammoth Revival Project
- Spouse: Ting Wu
- Awards: Franklin Institute Bower Prize for Achievement in Science (2011)
- Scientific career
- Fields: Chemistry, genetics, molecular engineering
- Workplaces: Harvard University; Massachusetts Institute of Technology
- Thesis: Genetic Elements within Yeast Mitochondrial and Mouse Immunoglobulin Introns (1984)
- Doctoral advisor: Walter Gilbert
- Doctoral students: Preston Estep; Jay Shendure
- Other notable students: Feng Zhang; Fina Kurreeman; Samira Musah
- Website: arep.med.harvard.edu/gmc/

George McDonald Church (born August 28, 1954) is an American geneticist, molecular engineer, chemist, serial entrepreneur, and pioneer in personal genomics and synthetic biology. He is the Robert Winthrop Professor of Genetics at Harvard Medical School, Professor of Health Sciences and Technology at Harvard University and Massachusetts Institute of Technology, and a founding member of the Wyss Institute for Biologically Inspired Engineering at Harvard University.

Through his Harvard laboratory, Church has co-founded around 50 biotechnology companies. In 2018, the Church laboratory at Harvard spun off 16 biotechnology companies in one year.

In 2017, Time magazine listed him in their list of 100 most influential people in the world. As of January 2023, Church is as a member of the Bulletin of the Atomic Scientists' Board of Sponsors.

== Early life and education ==
Church was born on August 28, 1954, on MacDill Air Force Base in Tampa, Florida, and grew up in nearby Clearwater, Florida. He attended high school at the preparatory boarding school Phillips Academy, in Andover, Massachusetts, from 1968 to 1972. He then attended Duke University, where he obtained a B.S. degree in zoology and chemistry in two years.

In the fall of 1973, Church began research work at Duke University with assistant professor of biochemistry Sung-Hou Kim, work that continued a year later in a graduate biochemistry program at Duke on an National Science Foundation fellowship.

As Peter Miller reported on Church for the National Geographic series, "The Innovators":

As a graduate student at Duke ... he used x-ray crystallography to study the three-dimensional structure of "transfer" RNA, which decodes DNA and carries instructions to other parts of the cell. It was groundbreaking research, but Church spent so much time in the lab—up to a hundred hours a week—that he neglected his other classes [in the fall of 1975].

As a result, Church was not compliant with Duke graduate academic policies, and was withdrawn from the degree program in January 1976. He was told that "[We] hope that whatever problems ... contributed to your lack of success ... at Duke will not keep you from a successful pursuit of a productive career." The work gave rise to publications including a PNAS report with Church as lead author on an early model for molecular interactions between the minor groove of double-stranded DNA and β-ribbons of proteins.

Church returned to graduate work at Harvard University in 1977 under Walter Gilbert, and completed a Ph.D in biochemistry and molecular biology working on mobile genetic elements within introns of yeast mitochondrial and mouse immunoglobulin genes (1984).

== Career ==
After completing his doctoral work, Church spent six months of 1984 at Biogen, the industrial laboratory site where Gilbert had relocated a sizable part of his former Harvard group. This was followed soon after by a Life Sciences Research Foundation postdoctoral fellowship at the University of California, San Francisco with Gail R. Martin, a member of the National Academy of Sciences and joint-discoverer of a technique to extract mouse embryonic stem cells.

Church joined the Harvard Medical School faculty as an assistant professor in 1986. Church is now the Robert Winthrop Professor of Genetics at Harvard Medical School, and a member of the Harvard-MIT health sciences and technology faculty. He was also a founding member of the Wyss Institute for Biologically Inspired Engineering at Harvard University. He served as the director of the Center of Excellence in Genomic Science (CEGS) at the Harvard Medical School, funded by a P50-type award from the National Human Genome Research Institute (NHGRI), a part of the National Institutes of Health.

He co-founded Veritas Genetics and its European and Latin American subsidiary, Veritas Intercontinental, with the idea of bringing the benefits of genomic data to millions of people globally.

Church was elected a member of the National Academy of Engineering in 2012 for contributions to human genome sequencing technologies and DNA synthesis and assembly.

In 2018, Church co-founded Nebula Genomics, a personal genomics company that offers a whole-genome sequencing service. The company says that it is developing its own blockchain, intending to provide free sequencing in exchange for users' genomic and personal data. The decentralized nature of a blockchain also has the potential to improve aspects of data privacy and security, but identification of individuals could still be possible (DNA itself is a unique identifier) and law enforcement could still issue search warrants or subpoena the data.

In 2021, Church joined as a co-founder of HLTH.network (formerly Shivom), a healthcare blockchain startup which created the world's first global genomics data sharing and analytics marketplace. The HLTH.network aims to be the "world's first base layer protocol for global health data." In 2025, Church joined Lila Sciences, an AI agent platform startup, as Chief Scientist.

=== George Church Institute of Regenesis: collaboration with BGI Group, China ===
Since 2007, Church has served on the scientific advisory board of BGI Group.

In 2017, BGI established the "George Church Institute of Regenesis", a research collaboration between Church's lab and about a dozen staffers at BGI in China. Dr. Xun Xu, executive director of BGI Group said:

Professor George Church is a legend in this field for his creative achievements in gene editing and genome synthesis. With support of advanced technology platform of China National GeneBank, the collaboration between BGI and Professor Church will bring top resources and talents together to overcome current bottleneck issues and further improve the technology.

On February 18, 2020, Nebula Genomics, a personal genomics company founded by Church, announced that had partnered up with BGI; the saliva samples sent to Nebula Genomics for decoding are then sent by the company to BGI labs in Hong Kong for sequencing. Nebula Genomics said that this partnership was made to bring down the cost of whole-genome sequencing (they offer 30x whole-genome sequencing for $299), since normally it has a cost that makes it inaccessible to most people.

=== Research ===
==== Church and the foundation of genomics ====
With Walter Gilbert, Church published the first direct genomic sequencing method in 1984. Described in that publication were the cyclic application of fluids to a solid phase alternating with imaging, plus avoidance of bacterial cloning, strategies that are still used in current dominant Next-Generation Sequencing technologies. These technologies began to affect genome-scale sequencing in 2005. Church also helped initiate the Human Genome Project in 1984. He invented the broadly applied concepts of molecular multiplexing and barcode tags, and his genome was the fifth whole human genome ever sequenced. Church was the first person to make his medical records and genome publicly available to researchers. Technology transfer of automated sequencing and software from his Harvard laboratory to Genome Therapeutics Corp. resulted in the first bacterial genome sequence and first commercial genome (the human pathogen Helicobacter pylori) in 1994. Church was co-inventor of nanopore sequencing in 1995, which is now commercially available (e.g. Oxford Nanopore Technologies), but not in the form embodied in Church's contribution to the original patents.

To aid in the interpretation and sharing of genomes, Church initiated the Personal Genome Project (PGP) in 2005, providing the world's only open-access human genome and trait data sets. Eight trios (mother, father, and child) from the Personal Genome Project are in the process of being chosen to act as the primary genome standards (reference materials) for the NIST+FDA genomeinabottle.org program.

Church furthermore announced his intention to publish his DNA via NFT and use the profits made through its sale to finance research conducted by Nebula Genomics. In June 2022 20 NFTs with his likeness were published instead of the originally planned NFTs of his DNA due to the market conditions at the time. Despite leading to mixed reactions the project is considered to be part of an effort to use the genetic data of 15,000 individuals to support genetic research. By using NFTs the project wants to ensure that the users submitting their genetic data are able to receive direct payment for their contributions.

==== Synthetic biology and genome engineering ====
Church has co-developed "genome engineering" technologies since 1997 via either general homologous recombination (recA and lambda-red) or via sequence-specific nucleases. Since 2004, his team has developed the use of DNA array (aka DNA chip) synthesizers for combinatorial libraries and assembling large genome segments. He co-developed Multiplex Automated Genome Engineering (MAGE) and optimized CRISPR/Cas9, discovered by Jennifer Doudna and Emmanuelle Charpentier for engineering a variety of genomes ranging from yeast to human. His laboratory's use of CRISPR in human induced pluripotent stem cells (hiPS) is the latest contender for precise gene therapy.

His team is the first to tackle a genome-scale change in the genetic code. This was done in a 4.7 million basepair genome of an industrially useful microbe (E. coli) with the goal of making a safer and more productive strain; this strain uses non-proteinogenic amino acids in proteins, and is metabolically and genetically isolated from other species.

He has co-invented several uses for DNA, including detectors for dark matter – Weakly interacting massive particles (WIMPs), anti-cancer "nano-robots", and strategies for digital data storage that are over a million times denser than conventional disk drives. Together with polymerase, DNA can be used to sense and store variation in photons, nucleotides, or ions.

==== The BRAIN initiative ====
Church was part of a team who, in a 2012 scientific commentary, proposed a Brain Activity Map, later named BRAIN Initiative (Brain Research through Advancing Innovative Neurotechnologies). They outlined specific experimental techniques that might be used to achieve what they termed a "functional connectome", as well as new technologies that will have to be developed in the course of the project, including wireless, minimally invasive methods to detect and manipulate neuronal activity, either utilizing microelectronics or synthetic biology. In one such proposed method, enzymatically produced DNA would serve as a "ticker tape record" of neuronal activity.

==== Gene therapy, ageing, and age reversal ====
Church worked on engineered adeno-associated viral vectors to evade innate immune and inflammatory responses. The research was published in Science Translational Medicine in 2021 and showed the possibility of a less immunogenic gene therapy with the new TLR9-edited Adeno-associated viruses (AAV) as a safer viral vector. Based on the research, Church and a postdoc from his lab who was also the first-author of the research, co-founded Ally Therapeutics. In 2017, the Church lab at Harvard created adeno-associated virus (AAV)-based single combination gene therapy "for simultaneous treatment of several age-related diseases", detailing the technology's efficacy in mitigating obesity, type II diabetes, heart failure, and renal failure in mice, and the work was published in PNAS. In early 2018, Rejuvenate Bio was launched from the Church lab at the Wyss Institute at Harvard to prevent and treat several age-related diseases in dogs, extending their overall lifespan. In the February 2020, Rejuvenate Bio, the company co-founded by Church, received an exclusive worldwide license from the Harvard Office of Technology Development to commercialise their gene therapy technology. As the co-founder of Rejuvenate Bio in an interview Church said:

Science hasn't yet found a way to make complex animals like dogs live forever, so the next best thing we can do is find a way to maintain health for as long as possible during the aging process.

The research group's progress toward gene therapy for aging has been very limited, however. A 2022 PNAS paper from the Church group has already been the subject of two corrections, one for incomplete conflict of interest disclosures and one for image duplication.

==== Space biology and space genetics ====
Church is a faculty member in the Consortium of Space Genetics at Harvard Medical School.

==== De-extinction, woolly mammoth revival project, and Colossal Biosciences ====
In March 2015, Church and his genetics research team at Harvard successfully copied some woolly mammoth genes into the genome of an Asian elephant. Using the CRISPR DNA editing technique, his group spliced genetic segments from frozen mammoth specimens, including genes from the ears, subcutaneous fat, and hair attributes, into the DNA of skin cells from a modern elephant. National Geographic, in an article titled "Mammoth-elephant hybrids could be created within the decade. Should they be?", reported:

Church's dreams of engineering a hybrid mammoth first deepened after an interview he did with the New York Times in 2008 about efforts to sequence the woolly mammoth genome.

This marked the first time that woolly mammoth genes had been functionally active since the species became extinct. Their work has not been subject to peer review, however. Church stated that "Just making a DNA change isn't that meaningful. We want to read out the phenotypes." To do that, the team plans to perform further tests to get the hybrid cells into becoming specialized tissues, and from there attempting to turn the hybrid elephant/mammoth skin cells into hybrid embryos that can be grown in artificial wombs.

On September 13, 2021, Church founded a biosciences and genetics company, Colossal Biosciences, with entrepreneur Ben Lamm. The company is attempting to use genetic code to revive the woolly mammoth by equipping Asian elephants with mammoth traits.

Laetitia Garriott de Cayeux, founder-CEO of Global Space Ventures and an investor in Colossal Biosciences, said:

In 2014, I asked my friend Elon Musk who he knew who was poised to make profound changes in the field of genomics, and he said: George Church. So in June 2014, I visited George at his lab in Boston. I immediately knew I'd be looking for an opportunity to collaborate with George. Global Space Ventures is excited to be backing Colossal.

In 2013, in response to a question from Der Spiegel, Church speculated that it could be technically possible to make a Neanderthal by reconstructing its DNA and modifying living human cells accordingly. Translation issues and misreporting led some media outlets to believe that Church was working on such a project and searching for a surrogate mother, causing controversy. Church clarified that he was not.

In 2025, Colossal reported the live birth of two "dire wolves" where gray wolf cells received 20 unique gene edits, including 15 edits that directly matched dire wolf DNA and notably an edit that re-introduced pale coat color. That August, Church founded an artificial intelligence company, Astromech, with Lamm.

==== Technology transfer, translational impact, and serial entrepreneurship ====
Through his Harvard lab, Church has co-founded around 50 biotech companies, including Veritas Genetics (human genomics, 2014, with Mirza Cifric, Preston Estep, Yining Zhao, Joe Thakuria), Warp Drive Bio (natural products, 2011, with Greg Verdine and James Wells), Alacris (cancer systems therapeutics, 2010, with Hans Lehrach, Bernhard Herrmann, and Shahid Imran), Knome (human genomics, 2007, with Jorge Conde and Sundar Subramaniam), Pathogenica (microbe and viral NGS diagnostics, 2009, with Yemi Adesokan), AbVitro (immunomes, 2010, with Francois Vigneault), Gen9 Bio (synthetic biology, 2009, with Joseph Jacobson and Drew Endy), EnEvolv (Genome Engineering), Joule Unlimited (SolarFuels, 2007, with Noubar Afeyan and David Berry), LS9 (green chemistry, 2005, with Chris Somerville, Jay Keasling, Vinod Khosla, Noubar Afeyan, and David Berry), and ReadCoor (spatial biology, 2016, with Richard Terry and Evan R. Daugharthy).

==== Support of open consent ====
Church spearheaded the concept and implementation of open access sequencing hardware and shareable human medical data. He has noted the potential for re-identification of human research participants and the tendency for consent forms to be opaque – proposing an alternative "open consent" mechanism. He has participated in the Presidential Commission for the Study of Bioethical Issues, cautioning about the risk of synthetic DNA and proposing risk-reduction via licensing and surveillance. His laboratory has a major bio-safety engineering focus.

Church's detailed online register of funding sources showed that he received funding totaling $686,000 from the nonprofit Jeffrey Epstein VI Foundation from 2005 to 2007. In 2008, after Jeffrey Epstein′s first conviction, Harvard University′s then president Drew Gilpin Faust held that the university were no longer to accept gifts from him, yet Epstein continued to help Church to raise funds after serving his prison sentence. Church said in 2019 that he regrets he did not know more about the donor.

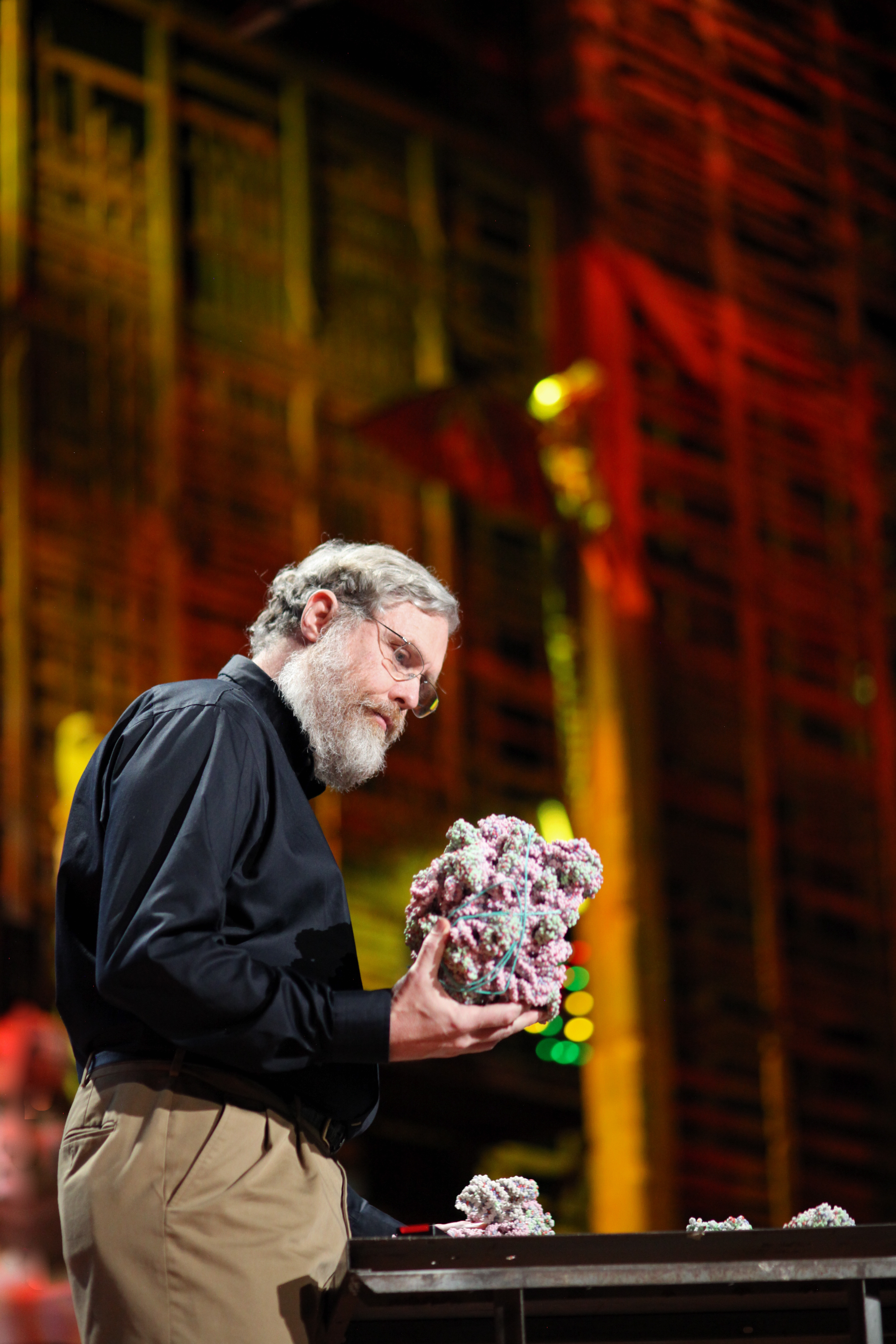
Church at TED 2010, picture by Steve Jurvetson

==== Support of open education ====
Church is an advisor to the Personal Genetics Education Project and has spent a day teaching at The Jemicy School. He has promoted citizen science, especially in the fields of synthetic biology and personal genomics. Since 2008, his team has been hosting an annual Genomes, Environments and Traits (GET) Conference with free online videos.

==== Rapid Deployment Vaccine Collaborative ====
Church is a member of the Rapid Deployment Vaccine Collaborative (RaDVaC), a group formed early in the SARS-CoV-2 pandemic to create an easily produced, free and open-source vaccine for self-administration.

== Popular science ==
Church authored the 2012 New Scientist's "top science book", Regenesis: How Synthetic Biology Will Reinvent Nature and Ourselves with Ed Regis. He appeared on popular TV shows including The Colbert Report.

In 2015, Jeneen Interlandi wrote an article on Church for Popular Science titled "The Church Of George Church: From reviving extinct species to hunting for dark matter, can a single scientist transform biology—and our lives?", where she states:

Like an engineer, he (George Church) tends to see the universe not as a disparate set of mysteries but as a machine with a vast array of buttons and levers, each begging to be pushed and pulled.

== Awards and honors ==
Church has received accolades including election to the National Academy of Sciences (in 2011), and the National Academy of Engineering (in 2012). He received the American Society for Microbiology Promega Biotechnology Research Award and the Bower Award and Prize for Achievement in Science of the Franklin Institute. He authored the NewScientist "top science book", Regenesis (on synthetic biology) with Ed Regis.

Other honors include the Triennial International Steven Hoogendijk Award in 2010 and the Scientific American Top 50 twice (for "Designing artificial life" in 2005 and "The $1000 genome" in 2006). Newsweek picked Church for their 2008 "Power of Ideas" recognition in the category of Medicine (for the Personal Genome Project). In September 2010, Church was honored for his work in genetics with the Mass High Tech All-Star Award.

He is a member of the Research Advisory Board of SENS Research Foundation.

== Personal life ==
Church is married to fellow Harvard Medical School faculty member in genetics Ting Wu.

Church has been outspoken in his support of following a vegan lifestyle, for reasons concerned with health, and with environmental and moral issues. When asked about his dietary choice, Church replied, "I've been vegan off-and-on since 1974 when I was inspired by participating in an MIT nutritional study, and quite strictly since 2004." He goes on to elaborate 4 reasons:

medical (cholesterol in fish & dairy), energy conservation (up to 20-fold impact), cruelty ("organic" animals are deprived of medicines that humans use), and risks of spreading pathogens (not just the flu) ... [noting that] veganism is an issue for which personal and global love of life, health and wealth align. It's a pity to lose parts of our humanity and planet just due to a lack of recipes.

George identifies as a sentientist. Sentientism is a naturalistic worldview that grants moral consideration to all sentient beings.

In the context of the Personal Genome Project, journalists at Forbes and Wired have noted Church's openness about his health issues, including dyslexia, narcolepsy, and high cholesterol (one of the motivations for his vegan diet). Church has many of his best ideas during the brief naps caused by his narcolepsy, and therefore does not treat it.

Church collaborated with transhumanist entrepreneur James Clement on the Supercentenarian Research Study, which aims to sequence the genomes of supercentenarians in hopes of discovering potential genetic factors behind their longevity. As of 2023, he is part of the Enhanced Games scientific and ethical advisory commission.

== Bibliography ==
- Regenesis (2014). ISBN 978-0465075706
- Polony Sequencing (2007). ISBN 978-1607831723

== See also ==
- Genome editing
- Woolly mouse
- List of people named in the Epstein files
