= Rapid Deployment Vaccine Collaborative =

COVID-19 vaccine research organization

- Abbreviation: Radvac
- Formation: March 2020
- Type: 501(c)(3) organization
- Key people: Preston Estep, Alexander Hoekstra, Don Wang, Ranjan Ahuja, Brian M. Delaney, George Church
- Website: radvac.org

The Rapid Deployment Vaccine Collaborative (Radvac) is a non-profit, collaborative, open-source vaccine research organization founded in March 2020 by Preston Estep and colleagues from various fields of expertise, motivated to respond to the COVID-19 pandemic through rapid, adaptable, transparent, and accessible vaccine development. The members of Radvac contend that even the accelerated vaccine approvals, such as the FDA's Emergency Use Authorization, does not make vaccines available quickly enough. The core group has published a series of white papers online, detailing both the technical principles of and protocols for their research vaccine formulas, as well as dedicated materials and protocols pages. All of the organization's published work has been released under Creative Commons non-commercial licenses, including those contributing to the Open COVID Pledge. Multiple individuals involved with the project have engaged in self-experimentation to assess vaccine safety and efficacy. As of January 2022, the organization has developed and published twelve iterations of experimental intranasal, multivalent, multi-epitope peptide vaccine formulas, and according to the Radvac website, by early 2021 hundreds of individuals had self-administered one or more doses of the vaccines described by the group.

== History ==
In March 2020, Preston Estep sent an email to several associates in an effort to determine whether any open-source vaccine projects were underway. Finding none, he and several colleagues formed Radvac in the following days, and began constructing the first generation of the Radvac research vaccine formula.

== Self-experimentation ==
Several of Radvac's core members and numerous others have engaged in self-experimentation to assess both the safety and efficacy of the vaccine formulations. Dr. Estep self-administered the first dose on March 30, 2020. As of early 2020, the group claims that hundreds of individuals had self-administered one or more doses of one or more generations of the Radvac experimental vaccine.

== Open-source and iterative vaccine research and development ==
Radvac considers responsive iteration a key asset in developing vaccines against an emerging disease such as COVID-19. In contrast to commercial vaccine R&D infrastructure, Radvac's core group adapted their vaccine designs in response to emerging research on the pathology and immunology of SARS-CoV-2 and COVID-19.

=== SARS-CoV-2 Peptide Vaccines ===
==== Early generations (gen. 1-6) ====
- Included primarily B cell epitopes, both emergent from computational predictions as well as early research in SARS-CoV-2 antibody mapping.

==== Generation 7 ====
- First inclusion of empirical T cell response data.

==== Generation 8 ====
- Better characterization of T cell response.

==== Generation 9 ====
- Latest and most robust characterization of T cell response, especially CD8 (cytotoxic T cell).

==== Generation 10 ====
- Improved solubility at physiological pH by the use of derivatized chitosan (for example: trimethyl chitosan [TMC] or hydroxypropyltrimethylammonium chloride chitosan [HACC]), instead of unmodified chitosan.
- Increased T helper activation combined with reduced MHC Class II restriction to more robustly activate cytotoxic T lymphocytes and B cells for antibody production.
- Surface display of antigens for improved antibody response.
- A smaller set of core peptides (5 peptides) combined with a list of optional peptides, providing greater functionality and improved representation of common MHC Class I alleles.
- An optional epitope sequence that includes an increasingly common variant (N501Y) in the Spike Receptor Binding Motif (RBM). The Radvac primary protective strategy remains focused on the more highly conserved epitopes involved in membrane fusion, but groups are testing the potential of this epitope sequence to boost the systemic antibody response.
- An optional dendritic cell targeting peptide for delivering T cell epitopes to dendritic cells, an important cell type in the presentation of T cell antigens.

==== Generation 11 ====
The only difference between Generation 10 and Generation 11 vaccine designs is the addition to Gen. 11 of the peptide MVC2-s, which represents the Receptor Binding Domain (RBD)/Receptor Binding Motif (RBM), and has 2 mutations that are present in variants of concern and interest: the L452R mutation found in Delta, Iota, and Kappa, and the N501Y mutation found in Alpha, Beta, Gamma and Mu.

==== Generation 12 ====
The Generation 12 vaccine design is very similar to Generation 11, but with one major change and some minor ones. The major change is the addition of the Omicron-specific SARS-CoV-2 Receptor Binding Motif peptide ("RBMO-sc") to the set of core peptides, and the subtraction of "MVC1-s" from the set of optional peptides. Certain T cell epitope peptides were also changed. "Orf1ab 5528T" replaced "Orf1 1636T" in the list of core peptides, because the former is bound by all of the Class I receptors that bind "Orf1 1636T" but it also binds several others. Radvac also eliminated "Nuc 264T-key" from the list of optional peptides because the homologous sequence in SARS-CoV-1 reportedly suppresses cytokine signaling.

== Open-source clinical trial design ==
In April 2022, Radvac published a proposal for a novel vaccine clinical trial design, called a "step-up challenge trial". The proposed model is intended to validate immuno-efficacy of broad-spectrum vaccines, including pan-coronavirus vaccines, but subjecting ("challenging") study participants to multiple related pathogens with different degrees of pathogenicity.

== Funding and awards ==
In December 2021 ACX Grants announced that Radvac had been awarded US$100,000 "to make open-source modular affordable vaccines." In May 2022 Radvac tweeted it had been awarded US$2.5 million from Balvi, a moonshot anti-covid effort established by Vitalik Buterin.
