= Preston Estep =

AI and Genome Scientist

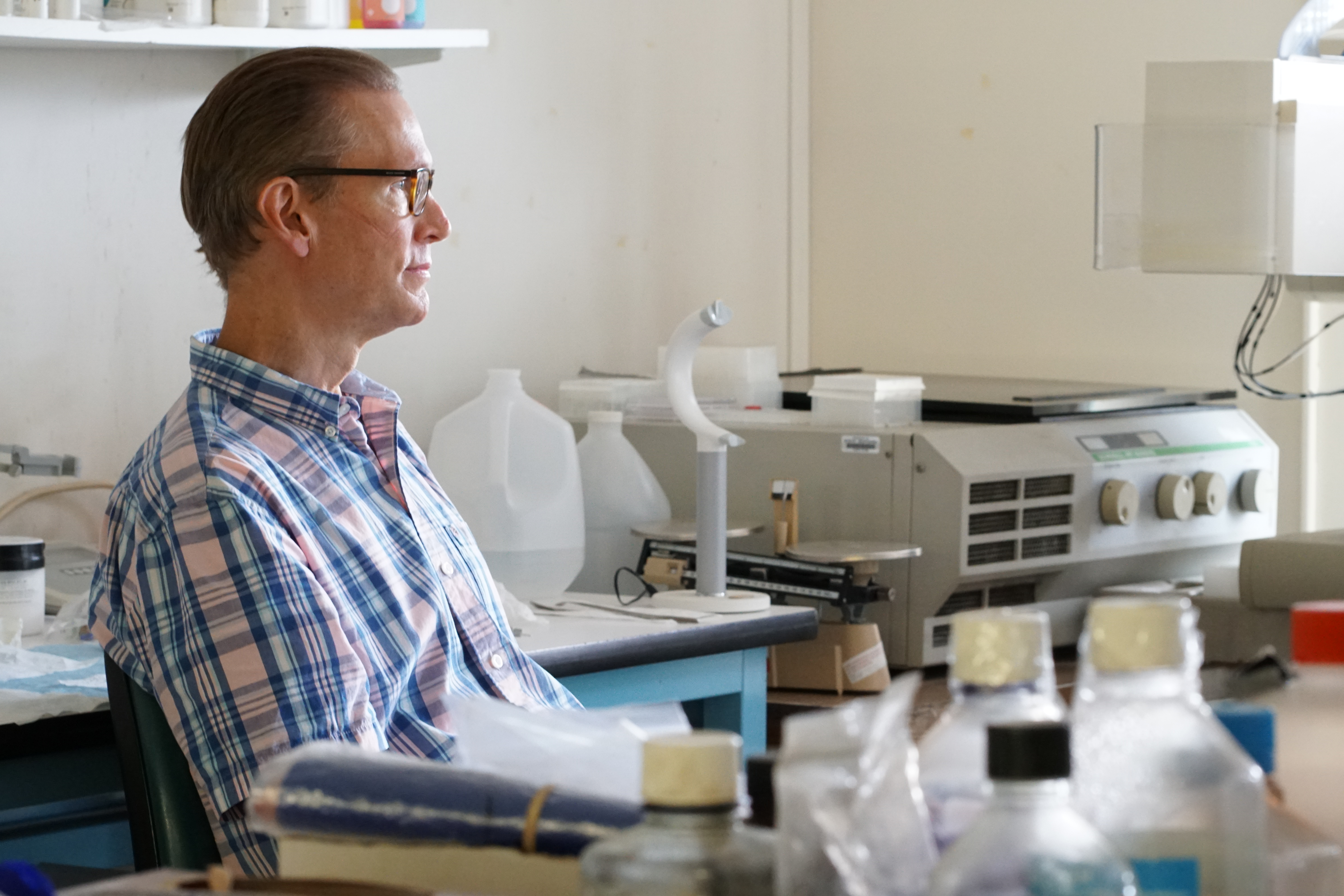
- Estep in 2020
- Education: Cornell University (B.S.); Harvard University (Ph.D.)
- Known for: Genomics, genetics, DNA sequencing
- Spouse: Martha Bulyk
- Scientific career
- Fields: Genomics, AI safety
- Workplaces: Harvard Medical School
- Thesis: Genomic approaches to connecting the transcriptional regulatory network of Saccharomyces cerevisiae stress responses (2001)
- Doctoral advisor: George M. Church

Preston "Pete" Wayne Estep III (born 1960) is an American biologist and science and technology advocate. He is a graduate of Cornell University, where he did neuroscience research, and he earned a Ph.D. in Genetics from Harvard University. He did his doctoral research in the laboratory of genomics pioneer Professor George M. Church at Harvard Medical School.

Estep is an inventor of several technologies including DNA chip-based readout of transposon-based selections and universal DNA protein-binding microarrays (PBMs). He is Director of Gerontology and an adviser to the Personal Genome Project, the first "open-source" genome project founded by George Church and based at Harvard Medical School. He is one of the main subjects of the documentary film Reconvergence.

Estep was the Chief Scientific Officer and co-founder of Veritas Genetics. He is one of the scientific experts featured throughout the first season of the Netflix series Unnatural Selection. In the show, Estep says it is important to obtain genomic information from extraordinary people. Subsequently, he tests the recall abilities of memory champion Nelson Dellis, and then the two tour a genetics lab and observe large DNA sequencing machines as they discuss sequencing Dellis's genome.

Early in the SARS-CoV-2 pandemic Estep founded the Rapid Deployment Vaccine Collaborative (RaDVaC), an open source vaccine project that controversially featured vaccine self administration.

== The Mindspan Diet ==
Estep is the author of the 2016 book The Mindspan Diet, which proposes a concept called "mindspan" (a measure of overall health and mental longevity). Estep suggests that mindspan is superior to lifespan and other measures of health and longevity because a key parameter of mindspan is good mental function throughout life. The Mindspan Diet presents a contrast between the longest lived people with high mental function ("the Mindspan Elite") and a second group of people from throughout the world who have good healthcare but shorter lives and the highest levels of cognitive decline ("the Mindspan Risk").

The book suggests that diet is a crucial differentiator, contrasting key dietary components and "biomarkers" (such as body weight, temperature, blood insulin and glucose, cholesterol, etc.) between Mindspan Elite and Mindspan Risk groups. It concludes that dietary iron is a significant difference, with Mindspan Elite having low iron levels in their bodies and brains, while Mindspan Risk has high iron levels. A key finding of the book, which contradicts current dietary recommendations, concerns certain refined carbohydrate foods. The book presents evidence that the base of the dietary pyramids for the Mindspan Elite consists of refined carbs like white rice (for mindspan leader Japan) and refined wheat pasta and bread (for the Mediterranean). Estep notes that these foods in Mindspan Elite countries and regions are not enriched with iron, whereas equivalent foods in Mindspan Risk countries and regions are enriched with iron.

== Longevity research ==
Estep is active in longevity and aging research and in criticizing anti-aging claims he suggests are unrealistic or poorly supported. He was the founding CEO and Chief Scientific Officer of TeloMe, Inc, a telomere analysis company and he is the former CEO of the human longevity research biotech company Longenity, Inc., which he founded with Matt Kaeberlein. Longenity folded but the company published research showing that a calorie restricted diet feminizes gene expression (in mice) and that it regulates both sirtuin and TOR aging regulatory pathways.

He has been highly critical of strategies for engineered negligible senescence (SENS), a plan to reverse and repair the damage of aging. In mid-2006 he was the lead author of a submission by a group of nine scientists to the MIT Technology Review SENS Challenge. The SENS Challenge panel of judges selected this submission as the best but concluded that it failed to meet the burden of proof established by the challenge: to show that "SENS is not worthy of learned debate." Some commentators have been critical of this requirement, saying that virtually any idea is worthy of some level of learned debate, though the terms of the prize were known in advance to all participants. Estep and colleagues failed to win the $20,000 prize on offer, but Technology Review's editor, Jason Pontin, nevertheless awarded them $10,000 for their "careful scholarship". (See the "De Grey Technology Review controversy" entry for more details.) Their submission criticized the SENS plan as essentially bringing Lysenkoism to modern aging research. Estep and colleagues donated the $10,000 award to the American Federation for Aging Research (AFAR).

Estep has been openly critical of SENS and of Aubrey de Grey for alleged misrepresentation of scientific evidence, and he suggests that the SENS plan does not address some of the most challenging aspects of aging including unrepaired DNA damage, noncancerous mutation and epimutation of the nuclear genome, and drift of cell and tissue-specific chromatin states. This latter damage type is generally considered a primary cause of cellular dedifferentiation and transdifferentiation, which degrade organismal function.

While critical of SENS and other anti-aging proposals, Estep is equally critical of the claim made by some in mainstream biogerontology that aging and/or death are incurable. He has challenged claimants to provide evidence for this assertion and points out the absence of evidence or physical law that might stand as a barrier to curing aging. He appears to advocate mind uploading more strongly than attempting to conquer aging.

== Rapid Deployment Vaccine Collaborative (Radvac) ==
In March 2020 in response to the Covid-19 pandemic, Estep co-founded the non-profit, open-source Rapid Deployment Vaccine Collaborative (RaDVaC), serving as Chief Science Officer. RaDVaC was founded as a self-experimentation-based, collaborative, distributed research initiative. The initiative's first several intranasal vaccine designs, made of chitosan and peptide motifs from SARS-CoV-2, relies on decades of previous animal and human subject research. Estep first tested the initial vaccine on himself and was joined by his colleagues at Radvac, among which was his mentor at Harvard, George M. Church. The Radvac open-source vaccine platform progressed several times over the years of the pandemic, and expanded to include other formats of immunogen design and administration, notably adopting the "prime and spike" model published by Mao and colleagues at the lab of Akiko Iwasaki. Radvac makes the detailed rationale and instructions for its vaccine formulations available in a versioned white paper.

== Artificial intelligence work and the Mind First Foundation ==
Estep is a founder and chief scientist of the Mind First Foundation, a non-profit chartered to articulate and expand the civilizational benefit of intelligence. In 2008, Estep presented at the Singularity Summit, proposing that brain-computer interface technology could help control AI. In 2014, Estep co-authored The Leverage and Centrality of Mind, an award-winning essay originally for the Foundational Questions Institute, arguing in favor of intelligence being the most important tool for solving significant challenges faced by humanity.

In a 2024 paper in "AI & Society", Estep examined assumptions underlying predictions of an artificial-intelligence takeover, arguing that some such scenarios rely excessively on anthropomorphic comparisons between AI systems and biological organisms. He identified eight attributes of digital AI that distinguish it from biological intelligence and argued that these differences could affect the development of instrumental goals, competition, and human–AI relations.

Estep also published a review of Eliezer Yudkowsky and Nate Soares's book "If Anyone Builds It, Everyone Dies" in the journal "SuperIntelligence – Robotics – Safety & Alignment". In his review, Estep challenged arguments that sufficiently advanced AI would necessarily develop self-interested goals leading to human extinction, and argued that advanced AI could instead play an important role in protecting humanity from risks posed by humans or other AI systems.

In 2026, Estep introduced what he termed the "instrumental succession" thesis in a paper published in the journal "Frontiers in Psychology". The instrumental succession thesis proposes that substantial control over human affairs could shift gradually to AI, even without AI systems developing an overriding terminal goal; human users and organizations may progressively increase AI capabilities and delegate decisions to them, resulting in an incremental transfer of agency. Estep contrasted this process with traditional theories of instrumental convergence and proposed continued human–AI integration as one possible response to risks of both human extinction and human irrelevance.
