= Eustace Conway =

American naturalist (born 1961)

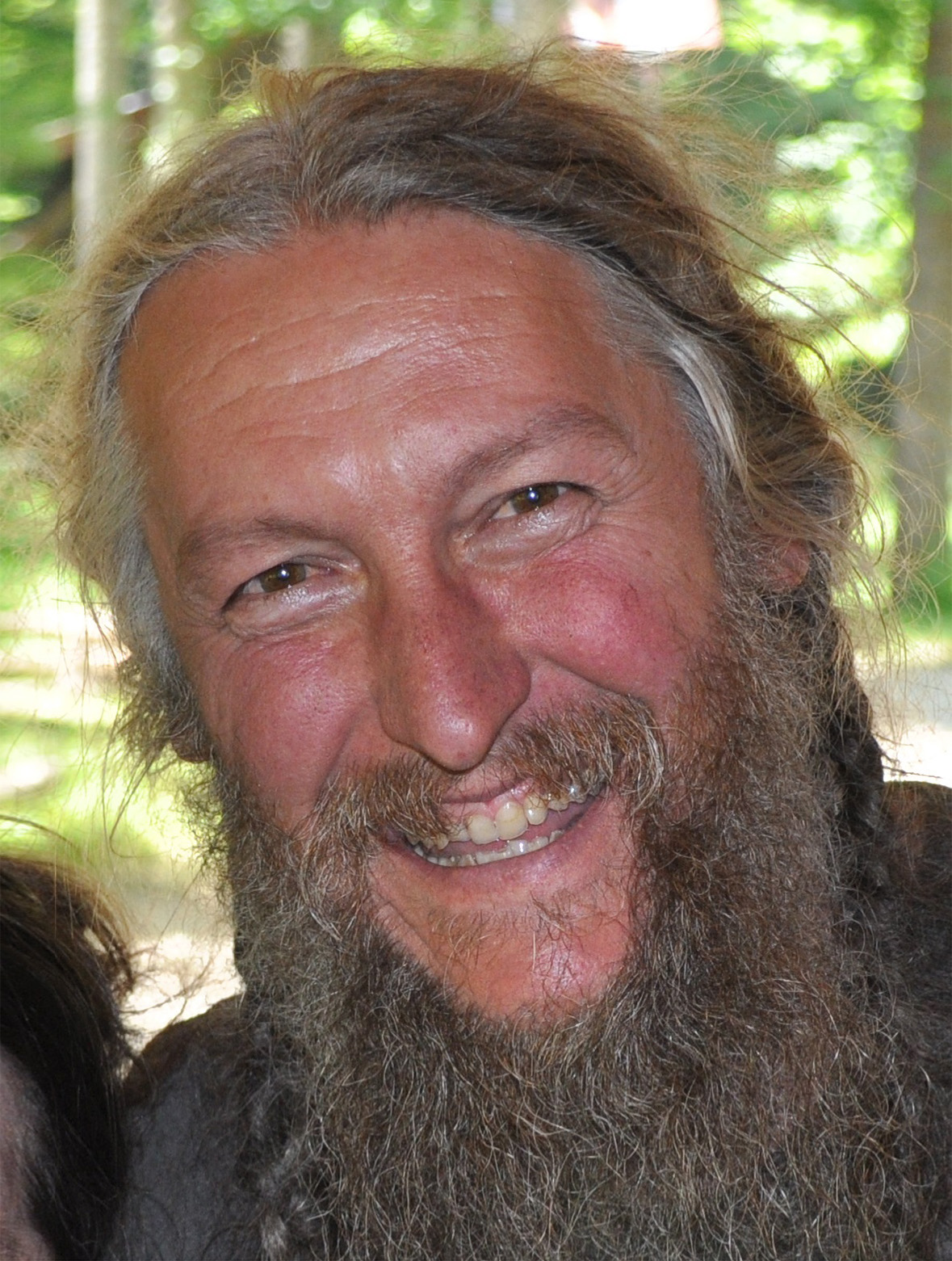
- Born: Eustace Robinson Conway IV; September 15, 1961 (age 64); Columbia, South Carolina, U.S.
- Education: Appalachian State University Bachelor's degrees in Anthropology and English
- Occupations: Naturalist, educator

Eustace Robinson Conway IV (born September 15, 1961) is an American naturalist and the subject of the book The Last American Man by Elizabeth Gilbert. He has also been the subject of Adventures in the Simple Life by Sarah Vowell on the weekly radio show This American Life with Ira Glass. He is the owner of the 1,000-acre (4.0 km^{2}) Turtle Island Preserve in Boone, North Carolina. He was a featured personality on the History channel show Mountain Men.

== Biography ==
Conway was born in Columbia, South Carolina. He has three siblings. At age 17, Conway left home so that he could live in a tipi in the woods. He has hiked the entire Appalachian Trail and claims to have set the world record of 103 days for crossing the United States on horseback from the Atlantic to the Pacific. However, according to The New York Times and Los Angeles Times of the day, as well as the book Bud & Me, the record for crossing the North American continent on horseback was actually 62 days. This journey was made by Bud and Temple Abernathy, aged 11 and 7, who rode 3,619 miles (5,824 km) from New York City to San Francisco on an equestrian journey, which started in August 1911.

The weekly radio show This American Life reported on Conway's cross-country journey in the episode "Adventures in the Simple Life", which aired on September 11, 1998. The show uses recordings taped by Conway and his party on a hand-held recorder.

Jack Bibbo directed a 2003 documentary film on Conway's life, Full Circle: A Life Story of Eustace Conway. Conway is also one of four featured individuals in the 2012 documentary film Reconvergence, which was directed by Edward Tyndall.

Conway appeared in Mountain Men, a reality television series on the History channel. The series focused on his daily life, including performing chores and preserving food for the coming winter. Threatened by a lien against his land, Conway fights to maintain ownership.

In November 2012, Turtle Island was forced to shut down public access because its traditional buildings violated modern building codes. In mid-December 2012, Conway appeared to make progress toward reaching a resolution with the North Carolina Building Code Council. However, immediately following this apparent progress with the code council, Conway was arrested for trespassing on a neighbor's property in a dispute over the property's border, leading to further legal challenges for Turtle Island.

Conway's problems with the North Carolina Building Code Council quickly gained notice of state officials. The North Carolina General Assembly stepped in, proposing an exemption to building-code requirements for primitive structures. Both the state's House and Senate voted unanimously to pass H774, which was signed into law by Governor Pat McCrory on June 12, 2013. These events were depicted in the Fox News special War on the Little Guy, hosted by John Stossel.
