= Reconvergence =

- theatrical poster
- Directed by: Edward Tyndall
- Produced by: Patrick Weaver; Cameron Brodie; Tyler Brodie; Edward Tyndall
- Starring: Eustace Conway; Preston Estep; Waite Rawls; Caleb Whitaker
- Cinematography: David Lowery
- Music by: Jason Wells
- Distributed by: Mobius Films
- Release date: May 6, 2012 (Maryland Film Festival)
- Running time: 84 min
- Country: United States
- Language: English

Reconvergence is a 2012 documentary film directed by Edward Tyndall featuring the lives and views of four characters: naturalist Eustace Conway, scientist Preston Estep, historian Waite Rawls, and poet Caleb Whitaker. The film features a wide exploration of their views on history, memory, consciousness, and the changes wrought by technologies. The film screened at various American film festivals and was distributed by Mobius Films.

== Characters ==
Conway runs the 1,000-acre (4.0 km^{2}) Turtle Island Preserve near Boone, North Carolina and advocates a back-to-nature way of life. Estep is a Harvard scientist and discusses the impact of modern recording technologies on memory and mortality. Rawls is the President and Chief Executive Officer of the Museum of the Confederacy, and presents his odyssey to discover the true sound of the infamous rebel yell, which was used by Confederate soldiers in battle. Whitaker is a poet and beat-generation enthusiast whose journey into the Amazon rainforest in search of psychotropic enlightenment follows in the footsteps of his predecessors William S. Burroughs and Allen Ginsberg.

== Reception ==
The film was selected as part of the Independent Filmmaker Project's Spotlight on Documentaries program during the 2011 Independent Film Week at Lincoln Center. After premiering at the Maryland Film Festival where the film was hailed as "an epic rumination on the nature of modern human existence", the film screened at film festivals throughout the United States, winning the Excellence in Filmmaking Award at the Indie Memphis Film Festival in 2012 and the Goujon Caille award for Best Documentary at the Cinema on the Bayou Film Festival in 2013.

== Festival screenings ==
Reconvergence screened at the following film festivals as part of its festival run:

- Maryland Film Festival 2012
- Oak Cliff Film Festival 2012
- San Antonio Film Festival 2012
- Atlanta International Documentary Film Festival 2012
- Rockport Film Festival 2012
- Costa Rica International Documentary Film Festival 2012
- Indie Memphis Film Festival 2012
- Cucalorus Film Festival 2012
- Cinema on the Bayou Film Festival 2013
- UNA Film Festival 2013
- Ozark Foothills Film Festival 2013
- Grandin Theatre Film Festival 2013
- South Texas Cinematheque 2013
- Prescott Film Festival 2013

== Awards ==
- Excellence in Filmmaking Award, Indie Memphis Film Festival, 2012
- Goujon Caille Award for Best Documentary, Cinema on the Bayou Film Festival, 2013
- Golden Lion Award for Best Documentary, Lindsey Film Festival, 2013
- Special Jury Award for Best Score, Lindsey Film Festival, 2013
- Honorable Mention Award, University Film and Video Association 2013

== Distribution ==
Reconvergence was distributed on DVD by Mobius Films, Inc. in 2013 and Gaiam TV acquired the North American distribution rights in 2015.
