= CR Society International =

The CR Society International (CRSI) is a nonprofit 501(c)(3) organization that was previously known as the CR Society or Calorie Restriction Society.

In 1994, Brian M. Delaney, Lisa Walford, and Roy Walford, along with several others, founded CR Society International. The group sponsors conferences and funds anti-aging research.

== See also ==
- CRON-diet
