= CronLab =

CronLab Ltd.
- Company type: Private
- Industry: Telecommunications, IT
- Founded: Gothenburg, Sweden (2009)
- Headquarters: London, United Kingdom
- Products: Web Filter – Hosted
- Website: http://cronlab.com

CronLab Limited is a privately held limited company which provides information security web filtering software to businesses and the public either directly or via integration into third-party products.

== History ==
CronLab was founded in Gothenburg, Sweden and introduced its first Anti-Spam Hardware Appliances in 2009. In 2010, the company moved its headquarters to London, United Kingdom.

The company has released software as a service hosted models of the spam filtering technology. awarded a recommendation by Techworld, and hosted email archiving solutions.

The company's security products aim to protect against email and web threats such as spam, spyware, trojans and viruses, and they also provide an email archiving solution. Their products can all also be white labelled.

=== Partnerships ===
CIDE Group, a toy manufacturer, partnered with CronLab on development of a children's tablet computer. The tablet, called "Kurio", features CronLab's hosted web-filtering and parental controls technology. CronLab has agreements for distribution in France, Belgium, Switzerland, Germany, Norway, Bulgaria, Moldova, Romania, Ireland and the United Kingdom.
