= Rebel yell =

Battle cry used by Confederate soldiers during the American Civil War

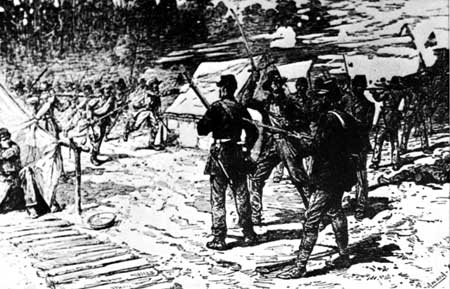
Confederate soldiers charge at the Battle of Shiloh

The rebel yell was a battle cry used by Confederate soldiers during the American Civil War. Confederate soldiers used the yell when charging to intimidate the enemy and boost their own morale, although the yell had many other uses. There are audio clips and film footage of veterans performing the yell many years later at Civil War veterans' reunions. The origin of the yell is uncertain.

== Sound ==
The sound of the yell has been the subject of much discussion. Civil War soldiers, upon hearing the yell from afar, would quip that it was either "Jackson, or a rabbit", suggesting a similarity between the sound of the yell and a rabbit's scream. The rebel yell has also been likened to the scream of a cougar. In media such as movies or video games, the yell is often portrayed as a simple "yee-haw" and in some parts of the United States, "yee-ha". The yell has also been described as similar to Native American cries. John Salmon Ford, in an 1896 interview with Frederic Remington, describes a charge his Texas Rangers made into a Comanche village in 1858 and that his troops gave the "Texas Yell". One description says it was a cross between an "Indian whoop and wolf-howl".

Several recordings of Civil War veterans performing the yell exist. One, from a 1938 newsreel documenting the 75th anniversary of the Battle of Gettysburg, documents several Confederate veterans performing the yell as a high-pitched "Wa-woo-woohoo, wa-woo woohoo." The Library of Congress has a film from the 1930s of a dozen or so veterans performing the yell individually and as a group. In 1935, a 90-year-old North Carolina veteran was recorded performing it.

Units were nicknamed for their apparent ability to yell during battle. The 35th Battalion of Virginia Cavalry, "White's Cavalry", were given the nom de guerre of "Comanches" for the way they sounded in battle. Given the differences in descriptions of the yell, there might have been several distinctive yells associated with the different regiments and their respective geographical areas. However, in the documentary film Reconvergence, historian Waite Rawls, the head of the Museum of the Confederacy, describes his long odyssey to recover recordings of the yell. He found two historical recordings of two different soldiers from two different states (North Carolina infantry, and Virginia cavalry), and he claims they sound nearly identical.

Though hardly a definitive description, having been published some 70 years after the war ended, Margaret Mitchell's classic Civil War novel Gone with the Wind has a character giving the yell sounding as a "yee-aay-eee" upon hearing the war had started. The film version, by contrast, has the yell sounding as a high-pitched "yay-hoo" repeated several times in rapid succession.

In Ken Burns's documentary The Civil War, Shelby Foote notes that historians are not quite sure how the yell sounded, being described as "a foxhunt yip mixed up with sort of a banshee squall". He recounts the story of an old Confederate veteran invited to speak before a ladies' society dinner. They asked him for a demonstration of the rebel yell, but he refused on the grounds that it could only be done "at a run", and couldn't be done anyway with "a mouth full of false teeth and a stomach full of food". Anecdotes from former Union soldiers described the yell with reference to "a peculiar corkscrew sensation that went up your spine when you heard it" along with the comment that "if you claim you heard it and weren't scared that means you never heard it". In the final episode, a sound newsreel of a 1930s meeting of Civil War veterans has a Confederate veteran giving a Rebel yell for the occasion, sounding as a "wa-woo-woohoo".

In his autobiography My Own Story, Bernard Baruch recalls how his father, a former surgeon in the Confederate army, would at the sound of the song "Dixie" jump up and give the rebel yell, no matter where he was: "As soon as the tune started Mother knew what was coming and so did we boys. Mother would catch him by the coattails and plead, 'Shush, Doctor, shush'. But it never did any good. I have seen Father, ordinarily a model of reserve and dignity, leap up in the Metropolitan Opera House and let loose that piercing yell."

The Confederate yell was intended to help control fear. As one soldier explained: "I always said if I ever went into a charge, I wouldn't holler! But the very first time I fired off my gun I hollered as loud as I could and I hollered every breath till we stopped." Jubal Early once told some troops who hesitated to charge because they were out of ammunition: Damn it, holler them across.

— Historian Grady McWhiney (1965)

== Origins ==
The origin of the cry is uncertain. One theory is that the rebel yell was born of a multi-ethnic mix. In his book The Rebel Yell: A Cultural History, Craig A. Warren puts forward various hypotheses on the origins of the rebel yell: Native American, Celt, Black or sub-Saharan, Semitic, Arab or Moorish, or an inter-ethnic mix. The rebel yell may have been born of a multi-ethnic mix. It has been described as "essentially a Celtic war cry, with a strong mix of Arabian ululation, and perhaps, a bit of Native American 'yip-yip-yip' at the very beginning". The ululations expressed by the peoples of many Middle Eastern and Asian cultures may suggest a link.

The yell has often been linked to Native American cries. Confederate soldiers may have imitated or learned the yell from Native Americans. Some Texas units mingled Comanche war whoops into their version of the yell.

Another claim is that it derived from the screams traditionally made by Irish and Scottish Highlanders when they made a Highland charge during battle. At the Battle of Killiecrankie "Dundee and the Chiefs chose to employ perhaps the most effective pre-battle weapon in the traditional (highland) arsenal – the eerie and disconcerting howl," also "The terror was heightened by their wild plaided appearance and the distinctive war-cry of the Gael – a high, savage whooping sound ..."

According to Tunisian academic historian Abdeljelil Temimi, the Arabian ululation was brought to North America by the Moriscos, where it combined with the Celtic war cry brought by settlers from Ireland, the Scottish Highlands, Brittany and northwest Spain.

A final explanation, with special reference to the rebel yells uttered by the Army of Northern Virginia is that the rebel yell was partly adapted from the specialized cries used by men experienced in fox hunting. Sidney Lanier, the poet and Confederate veteran, described his unit's yell as "a single long cry as from the leader of a pack of hounds."

Considering the existence of many differing versions of the yell, it is possible that it had multiple origins.

Use of the "Southern war cry" precedes the Civil War. In the mid- to late-1850s in the Kansas Territory, "free-state" (anti-slavery) forces battled against pro-slavery forces as the territory's determination on slavery was in violent dispute. Sam Reeder was a "free-state" or "free-soil" combatant against a pro-slavery militia at the Battle of Hickory Point in September 1856. "I could hear the sound of shots from the direction of Hickory Point, accompanied at intervals by fierce yells," remembered Reeder. "A young fellow near me remarked: 'Our men must be hitting them the way they holler.' It was not that; it was the ... Southern war cry."

One of the earliest accounts of the yell comes from the First Battle of Manassas (Bull Run) during then Brig. General Thomas Jonathan Stonewall Jackson's assault at Henry House Hill. An order was given during a bayonet charge to "yell like furies" in routing the Federal forces under General Irvin McDowell.

== Contemporaneous accounts ==
Then arose that do-or-die expression, that maniacal maelstrom of sound; that penetrating, rasping, shrieking, blood-curdling noise that could be heard for miles and whose volume reached the heavens–such an expression as never yet came from the throats of sane men, but from men whom the seething blast of an imaginary hell would not check while the sound lasted.

— Colonel Keller Anderson of Kentucky's Orphan Brigade

It paragons description, that yell! How it starts deep and ends high, how it rises into three increasing crescendos and breaks with a command of battle.

— a New Orleans Times-Picayune reporter

In an instant every voice with one accord vigorously shouted the 'Rebel yell,' which was so often heard on the field of battle. 'Woh-who-ey! who-ey! who-ey! Woh-who-ey! who-ey!' etc. (The best illustration of this "true yell" which can be given the reader is by spelling it as above, with directions to sound the first syllable 'woh' short and low, and the second "who" with a very high and prolonged note deflecting upon the third syllable "ey.")

— Colonel Harvey Dew of the 9th Virginia Cavalry, in Century Illustrated Monthly Magazine (1892)

At last it grew too dark to fight. Then away to our left and rear some of Bragg's people set up 'the rebel yell'. It was taken up successively and passed around to our front, along our right and in behind us again, until it seemed almost to have got to the point whence it started. It was the ugliest sound that any mortal ever heard – even a mortal exhausted and unnerved by two days of hard fighting, without sleep, without rest, without food and without hope ...

— Narrative of then-Lieutenant Ambrose Bierce, 2nd Brigade, 2nd Division, XXI Corps, Army of the Cumberland, at the Battle of Chickamauga (Last Union defenses on Horseshoe Ridge, September 20, 1863)

...the Southern soldiers cannot cheer, and what passes muster for that jubilant sound is a shrill ringing scream with a touch of the Indian war-whoop in it.

— William Howard Russell, war correspondent for The Times

== In popular culture ==
- Rebel Yell is the name of a brand of bourbon whiskey made in Kentucky. Billy Idol's song and album "Rebel Yell" was named after the whisky.
- Stan Freberg began his comedy recording of "The Yellow Rose of Texas" with his version of the rebel yell.
- An approximation of the yell can be heard in the 1951 film The Red Badge of Courage, starring Audie Murphy.
- In the Civil War video game War of Rights, when the Union team's morale state is reduced, CSA troops will perform the yell.

== Sources ==
- StonewallBrigade.com-Rebel Yell
- Dwelly, E., (1973), The Illustrated Gaelic English Dictionary, 8th Edition, Gairm Publications, Glasgow.
- Hill, J. M. (1986). Celtic Warfare 1595–1763. Edinburgh: John Donald Publishers Ltd.
- MacLeod, J. (1996). Highlanders – A History of the Gaels. London: Hodder & Stoughton. ISBN 0-340-63991-1.
- McDonald, F., (1978), "The Ethnic Factor in Alabama History: A Neglected Dimension", Alabama Review, 31, pp. 256–65.
- McDonald, F., & McDonald, E.S., (1980), "The Ethnic Origins of the American People, 1790", William & Mary Quarterly, 37, pp. 179–99.
- McWhiney, Grady. 1965. "Who Whipped Whom? Confederate Defeat Re-examined". (Originally published in Civil War History, XI, No. 1 (March 1965) 5–26). Essays on the Civil War and Reconstruction Ed. Erwin Unger. Holt, Rinehart and Winston, Inc. New York.
- Russell, W.H., (1863), My Diary North and South, T.O.H.P. Burnham, Boston.

== Recordings ==
- Actual recording of a rebel yell, performed by a veteran in 1935
- Rare Footage of Civil War Veterans Doing the Rebel Yell
- Civil war veteran soldier footage taken between 1913 and 1938
