= Veritas Genetics =

Personal genomics startup in Danvers, Massachusetts, USA

- Company type: Private
- Industry: Biotechnology; Personal genomics
- Founded: 2014
- Founders: George M. Church; Mirza Cifric; Preston Estep; Jonathan Zhao
- Headquarters: Danvers, Massachusetts, United States
- Key people: Mirza Cifric (CEO); Preston Estep (Chief Scientific Officer)
- Products: myGenome
- Website: www.veritasgenetics.com

Veritas Genetics is a personal genomics startup based in Danvers, Massachusetts. According to the company's press release, it was among the first companies to offer whole genome sequencing and interpretation for under $1,000.

It was co-founded in 2014 by George M. Church, Mirza Cifric, Preston Estep, and Jonathan Zhao.

In 2018, the company launched its flagship product, myGenome, with the stated goal of providing consumers with information about their inherited genetic risk including cancer, cardiovascular and carrier status, reaction to certain medications (pharmacogenomics) and more, all based on whole-genome sequencing results. The company further reduced to cost of whole genome sequencing to only $199 per order during a promotional period which attracted media attention, as this promotional price was far below traditional prices for consumer-grade genome sequencing at the time.

CNBC included the company on its Disruptor 50 list in 2018 and 2019.

In December 2019, the company announced that it was considering strategic options.

In January 2020, the company reversed course and announced that it had obtained further funding, would resume U.S. operations.

In March 2022, Veritas was acquired by leading global digital health provider LetsGetChecked.
