= TIARA (database) =

Database of personal genomics information

Content
- Description: Total Integrated Archive of Short-Read and Array

Contact
- Research center: Seoul National University
- Laboratory: Genomic Medicine Institute, Medical Research Center
- Authors: Dongwan Hong
- Primary citation: Hong & al. (2011)
- Release date: 2010

Access
- Website: http://tiara.gmi.ac.kr

The Integrated Archive of Short-Read and Array (TIARA) database contains personal genomic information obtained from next generation sequencing techniques and ultra-high-resolution comparative genomic hybridization.

== See also ==
- Personal genomics
