= James Clement (entrepreneur) =

American lawyer and transhumanist (born 1955)

James W. Clement (born 1955) is an American lawyer, entrepreneur, and transhumanist. Clement is best known for organizing the Supercentenarian Research Study, which analyzed the DNA of supercentenarians from 14 states and seven countries over a period of six years.

Clement is currently the President and director of the U.S. 501(c)(3) nonprofit Betterhumans Inc, which promotes transhumanist biomedical research, including life extension.

== Early life and career ==
James Clement was born in Sioux City, IA, on November 1, 1955. He received his Bachelor of Arts in political science and psychology from Truman State University, Kirksville, MO in 1978; a juris doctor from the University of California, Hastings College of Law, San Francisco, CA, in 1982; and a Master’s degree in taxation from the New York University School of Law, New York, NY, in 1986.

In 1988, he founded the Chapter House Brewpub in Ithaca, NY, a gathering spot for Cornell University and Ithaca College students and faculty, where he served as brew master and manager until 1997.

Clement was the Executive Director of Humanity+ from 2007-2008. He also founded and co-published an online and print transhumansist magazine, h+ Magazine, from 2008 to 2009, with R.U. Sirius as the Editor; and is the author of The Switch: Ignite Your Metabolism with Intermittent Fasting, Protein Cycling and Keto.

In 2010 he initiated the Supercentenarian Research study with the support of Harvard geneticist George Church. The aim of the study is to identify the genetic advantages that supercentenarians may have that have enabled them to live longer, healthier lives. Even though the study was preliminary with a small sample size (approximately 60 individuals), Church was quoted in the New York Times as saying, “The farther out you go on the bell curve, the more likely you are to find something, even with a small sample size.”

He founded h+ Magazine in order to provide a “voice” for Human Enhancement (HET) technologies and to encourage nanotechnology, biology, cognitive, and AI DIYers in pursuit of transhumanism’s goals.
