= Anti-spam appliances =

Computer hardware devices to reduce e-mail spam

Anti-spam appliances are software or hardware devices integrated with on-board software that implement e-mail spam filtering and/or anti-spam for instant messaging (also called "spim") and are deployed at the gateway or in front of the mail server. They are normally driven by an operating system optimized for spam filtering. Anti-spam appliances have existed in wide area networks and home networks since the early 2000s.

The anti-spam appliances that are found in wide area networks are usually built from server hardware and are generally used by middle-market and multinational companies, Internet service providers, and universities, and anti-spam appliances that are found in home networks are usually built from embedded hardware and are generally used by consumers. Anti-spam technology companies that have produced anti-spam appliances for wide area networks and/or home networks include, but are not limited to Proofpoint, IronPort, Barracuda Networks, D-Link, Spam Cube, Netgear and TrustEli.

Some main reasons why hardware anti-spam appliances may be selected instead of software could include, the customer's preference to buy hardware rather than software due to its ease of installation, the appliance can manage itself after it is installed, and anti-spam appliances commonly provide other security features such as anti-virus protection.
