= CRON-diet =

Nutrient-rich, reduced calorie diet

The CRON-diet (Calorie Restriction with Optimal Nutrition) is a nutrient-rich, reduced calorie diet developed by Roy Walford, Lisa Walford, and Brian M. Delaney. The CRON-diet involves calorie restriction in the hope that the practice will improve health and retard aging, while still attempting to provide the recommended daily amounts of various nutrients. Other names include CR-diet, Longevity diet, and Anti-Aging Plan. The Walfords and Delaney, among others, founded the CR Society International to promote the CRON-diet.

== Context ==
There is no experimental evidence that calorie restriction can slow biological aging in humans. The biological mechanisms for the supposed antiaging effects are not determined, as of 2021.

== Origins ==
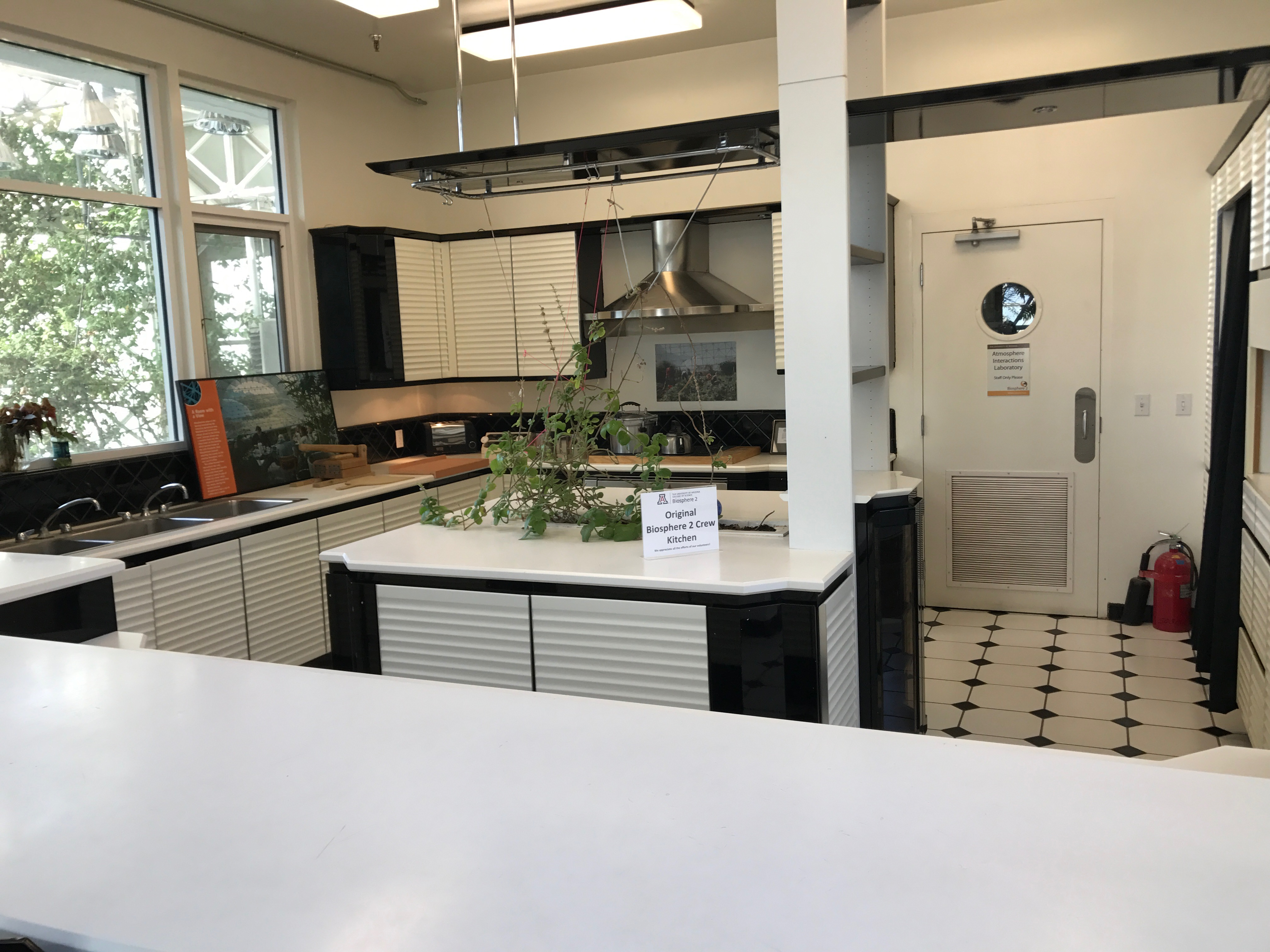
The "Crew Kitchen" inside Biosphere 2

The CRON-diet was developed from data Walford compiled during his participation in Biosphere 2 from 1991 to 1993. The subjects ate a diet low in fat and in calories but "nutrient-dense", derived from the food crops raised inside the Biosphere.

== Debate on effectiveness ==
The writer Christopher Turner in The Telegraph reported that Walford claimed that the diet "will retard your rate of ageing, extend lifespan (up to perhaps 150 to 160 years, depending on when you start and how thoroughly you hold to it), and markedly decrease susceptibility to most major diseases." The same article noted however that the diet "failed to dramatically increase Walford's lifespan; he died in 2004 aged 79."

A review of the effects of calorie restriction in humans by Anna Picca and colleagues in 2017 noted that direct evidence was limited to what had been "recorded from the members of the Calorie Restriction Society, who have imposed on themselves a regimen of severe CR with optimal nutrition (CRON), believing to extend in this way their healthy lifespan." The review noted that bone density was reduced but that bone strength was improved and maximal aerobic capacity per unit body mass was maintained or increased, while measures of quality of life including depression and physical function were improved. The review observed that one outcome had been the development of calorie restriction mimetic drugs which would be tested in clinical trials on humans.

== Reception ==
The journalist Pagan Kennedy wrote an opinion piece for The New York Times, mentioning Walford's book The 120 Year Diet and his hope of living for more than 100 years on the CRON diet, noting that instead he died of Lou Gehrig disease at age 79: her piece was titled "The Secret to a Longer Life? Don't Ask These Dead Longevity Researchers".

The journalist Emily Yoffe tried the CRON-diet for Slate. She wrote that Walford had written a book about the diet called Beyond the 120 Year Diet, in which a "typical dinner" consisted of salad, lentils, brown rice, bulgur, a stalk of broccoli, and a glass of skimmed milk. Yoffe reported that after more than 2 months on the diet, she had not experienced the promised results: her "very poor" sleep had not improved much; her "energy" remained low; her "foggy mind" was still foggy. But she was pleased that she once again could experience loose-fitting pants.
