= OpenSNP =

Open source genetics database (2011–2025)

openSNP
- The logo of the openSNP project
- Website type: Genetic Database
- Dissolved: April 30, 2025; 18 months ago
- Founder: Bastian Greshake
- Website: opensnp.org
- Commercial: No
- Launched: September 28, 2011; 15 years ago
- Content license: Creative Commons 0

openSNP was an open source website where users could share their genetic information. On 31 March 2025 the owners announced that the site would close permanently on 30 April 2025, citing the causes as the bankruptcy of DNA testing company 23andMe, and public fears of DNA misuse.

Users could upload their genes, including gender, age, eye color, medical history, Fitbit data. With a focus on user patient-led research (PLR), there was hope it could redefine the way health research is conducted.

"It promises to be a vital supplement to standard research: it can focus on conditions that are neglected by standard research, such as rare diseases or side effects, and can draw on a broader range of data and deliver outcomes more rapidly. It can also be a way of realising valuable forms of social interaction and support in cases where members of a community conduct PLR together, for example, patients suffering from the same illness."

The name of the project was inspired by single nucleotide polymorphism (SNP), which is a DNA variation at a specific location on a strand. Scientists have discovered that there is a correlation between certain SNPs and genetic predispositions such as Mendelian disease.

The data of the project is licensed under Creative Commons 0, while the code of the website itself is hosted on GitHub under the MIT License.

== Potential risks ==
Since openSNP was an open-sourced social network that was readily available on the internet, there were questions raised surrounding privacy issues and other risks. Though the sign-up page warned potential users of the record lasting forever, participants had to decide for themselves whether the benefits outweighed the pitfalls. As health research continues to progress, more and more scientific analysis places a greater role on PLR, leading to increased demands for a new social contract to secure conditions for participants. Human participant research not only places subjects into potentially harmful situations, but also can lead to other risks such as exploitation and self-experimentation under non-controlled environments. There is also the risk of biases and distortions "arising from self-reporting and self-collected data". However, during the project's lifetime, the effects of genetic discrimination were unknown due to the lack of evidence.

"Till date no systematic evaluation of the true value of anonymity with respect to the cost of genome information and insight has been assessed in real-life settings. This would require appropriate availability of information including caveats to whole genome assessment and analysis"

Still, with the rise of open genomic research, privacy protection frameworks need strengthened efforts beyond "traditional legal and organizational safeguards", technical solutions such as data encryption, and mutual understanding. In a study of an article done through the University of San Diego School of Law, Sejin Ahn discovered that perhaps the most critical solution that needs to be strengthened is the legislative ban on re-identification and anti-discrimination protection. Ahn explains that these remedies must be addressed and updated in order to protect participants from privacy breaches.

A survey of users of the site found that while most respondents 'were well aware of the privacy risks of their involvement in open genetic data sharing and considered the possibility of direct, personal repercussions troubling, they estimated the risk of this happening to be negligible'.

== Potential benefits ==
The website provided a proof-of-concept mechanism for allowing anyone to be involved in any stage of genomics research. This model allowed partnerships to form independent of governments, academia or for-profit organisations and was a way of creating the enabling conditions for anyone to access, influence and get involved in every stage of the genomics research cycle. The model reflected the value that users of such sites attach to sharing data as 'contributing to the common good of research'.

The transparent open-source code arguably allowed greater scrutiny and oversight than similar closed-source projects.

== History ==
The website was founded by German biologist, Bastian Greshake.

In 2012, Greshake sent a vial of his saliva to 23andMe, a genomics company, to study his own DNA. His results suggested that he was at risk of prostate cancer, and then recommended to his father to receive a medical examination as well. The doctor found a growing tumor in his father's prostate and was able to catch it early. After receiving his results, he posted them on GitHub, hoping to find other users willing to share their personal genetic makeup. Upon realizing that many people were unwilling or did not include a lot of information that was necessary for scientific research, Greshake created openSNP.

"Maybe there are people who are interested in publishing their genetic information on the web to make it available, but those people don't have the opportunity,"

Though Greshake acknowledges that there are services that allow people to test their own genes and discover inherent predispositions, they are often expensive, or difficult to access. In 2013, the Food and Drug Administration (FDA) forced company 23andMe to stop marketing their spit-box screening tests due to lack of scientific evidence. However, in 2015, the FDA eased their restrictions and stated that carrier screening tests would not have to undergo preliminary review.

Greshake hoped that by making openSNP accessible and simple, it would not only attract the public to get interested in their genetic makeup, but also to take it down innovative avenues, such as turning openSNP data into music.

On 31 March 2025, Grenshake announced the sunsetting and subsequent deletion of all user data from openSNP, citing a US and wider global "rise in far-right and other authoritarian governments". The website and all data was deleted on 30 April 2025.

== Timeline ==
- September 2011 — openSNP is released.
- September 2012 — Fitbit data inclusion feature added, seeing as obesity is correlated with specific SNPs.
- May 2014 — The website reached 1000 genotypings.
- September 2015 — Crowdfunding campaign started on Patreon platform.
- February 2016 — Code of Conduct is created that outlines appropriate behavior and general guidelines.
- August 2016 — openSNP was a participant of Google Summer of Code.
- April 2025 — openSNP was shut down and all data was deleted.
