= Brian Manning Delaney =

American philosopher and author

Brian Manning Delaney (born 1965 in California) is a venture investor and researcher in biogerontology. Delaney is a partner at the longevity biotech venture fund Emerging Longevity Ventures. Previously he was a philosophy professor and translator of the works of Hegel. He divides his time between Stockholm and the U.S.

Delaney is also one of the founding members of the Swedish Hegel Society (Svenska Hegelsällskapet), and is on the editorial board of Site Magazine. His articles for Site have focused on German philosophy as well as on European attitudes towards the U.S.

His and Sven-Olov Wallenstein's Swedish translation of Hegel's Phänomenologie des Geistes (in Swedish: Andens Fenomenologi) was published in September, 2008. His translation of Den andra födan (English: As a Weasel Sucks Eggs), by Daniel Birnbaum and Anders Olsson, was published by Sternberg Press in October, 2008.

In April 2009, the Swedish Academy awarded him a special honor for his work on the translation of the Phenomenology of Spirit.

His earliest research was in artificial intelligence, working first with Paul Cohen at the University of Massachusetts, then as an undergraduate with Eugene Charniak at Brown University.

== Work in Biogerontology ==
Delaney founded the Usenet group sci.life-extension, and co-founded, with Lisa Walford, Roy Walford, and others, the CR Society International. He recently co-authored a popular science book on modulating the aging process, The Longevity Diet.

More recently, he has worked closely with William Faloon on a number of projects. He and Faloon co-founded Vitality in Aging Research Group. He is currently president of Age Reversal Network, founded by Faloon.

In 2020, he joined the Rapid Deployment Vaccine Collaborative (RaDVaC).
