= Personal genomics =

Branch of genomics concerned with the genome of an individual

Personal genomics or consumer genetics is the branch of genomics concerned with the sequencing, analysis and interpretation of the genome of an individual. The genotyping stage employs different techniques, including single-nucleotide polymorphism (SNP) analysis chips (typically 0.02% of the genome), or partial or full genome sequencing. Once the genotypes are known, the individual's variations can be compared with the published literature to determine likelihood of trait expression, ancestry inference and disease risk.

Automated high-throughput sequencers have increased the speed and reduced the cost of sequencing, making it possible to offer whole genome sequencing including interpretation to consumers since 2015 for less than $1,000. The emerging market of direct-to-consumer genome sequencing services has brought new questions about both the medical efficacy and the ethical dilemmas associated with widespread knowledge of individual genetic information.

== In personalized medicine ==
Personalized medicine is a medical method that targets treatment structures and medicinal decisions based on a patient's predicted response or risk of disease. The National Cancer Institute or NCI, an arm of the National Institutes of Health, lists a patient's genes, proteins, and environment as the primary factors analyzed to prevent, diagnose, and treat disease through personalized medicine.

There are various subcategories of the concept of personalized medicine such as predictive medicine, precision medicine and stratified medicine. Although these terms are used interchangeably to describe this practice, each carries individual nuances. Predictive medicine describes the field of medicine that utilizes information, often obtained through personal genomics techniques, to both predict the possibility of disease, and institute preventative measures for a particular individual. Precision medicine is a term very similar to personalized medicine in that it focuses on a patient's genes, environment, and lifestyle; however, it is utilized by National Research Council to avoid any confusion or misinterpretations associated with the broader term. Stratified medicine is a version of personalized medicine which focuses on dividing patients into subgroups based on specific responses to treatment, and identifying effective treatments for the particular group.

Examples of the use of personalized medicine include oncogenomics and pharmacogenomics. Oncogenomics is a field of study focused on the characterization of cancer–related genes. With cancer, specific information about a tumor is used to help create a personalized diagnosis and treatment plan. Pharmacogenomics is the study of how a person's genome affects their response to drugs. This field is relatively new but growing fast due in part to an increase in funding for the NIH Pharmacogenomics Research Network. Since 2001, there has been an almost 550% increase in the number of research papers in PubMed related to the search terms pharmacogenomics and pharmacogenetics. This field allows researchers to better understand how genetic differences will influence the body's response to a drug and inform which medicine is most appropriate for the patient. These treatment plans will be able to prevent or at least minimize the adverse drug reactions which are a, "significant cause of hospitalizations and deaths in the United States." Overall, researchers believe pharmacogenomics will allow physicians to better tailor medicine to the needs of the individual patient. As of November 2016, the FDA has approved 204 drugs with pharmacogenetics information in its labeling. These labels may describe genotype-specific dosing instructions and risk for adverse events amongst other information.

Disease risk may be calculated based on genetic markers and genome-wide association studies for common medical conditions, which are multifactorial and include environmental components in the assessment. Diseases which are individually rare (less than 200,000 people affected in the USA) are nevertheless collectively common (affecting roughly 8–10% of the US population). Over 2500 of these diseases (including a few more common ones) have predictive genetics of sufficiently high clinical impact that they are recommended as medical genetic tests available for single genes (and in whole genome sequencing) and growing at about 200 new genetic diseases per year.

== Cost of sequencing an individual's genome ==
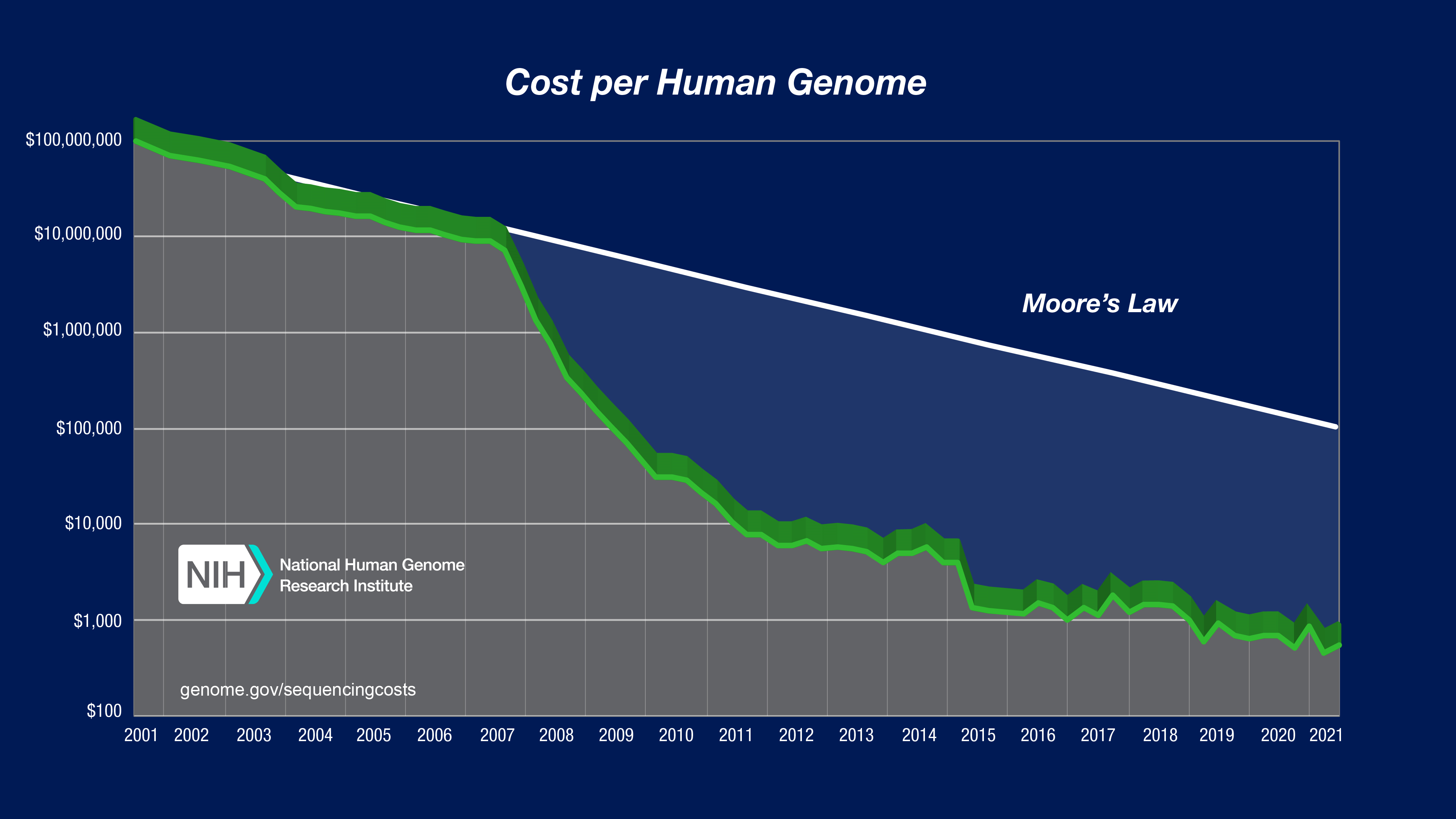
Typical cost of sequencing a human-sized genome, on a logarithmic scale. Note the drastic trend faster than Moore's law beginning in January 2008 as post-Sanger sequencing came online at sequencing centers.

The cost of sequencing a human genome is dropping rapidly, due to the continual development of new, faster, cheaper DNA sequencing technologies such as "next-generation DNA sequencing".

The National Human Genome Research Institute, an arm of the U.S. National Institutes of Health, has reported that the cost to sequence a whole human-sized genome has dropped from about $14 million in 2006 to below $1,500 by late 2015.

There are 6 billion base pairs in the diploid human genome. Statistical analysis reveals that a coverage of approximately ten times is required to get coverage of both alleles in 90% human genome from 25 base pair reads with shotgun sequencing. This means a total of 60 billion base pairs that must be sequenced. In 2011, an Applied Biosystems SOLiD, Illumina or Helicos sequencing machine could sequence 2 to 10 billion base pairs in each $8,000 to $18,000 run. The cost must also take into account personnel costs, data processing costs, legal, communications and other costs. One way to assess this is via commercial offerings. The first such whole diploid genome sequencing (6 billion bp, 3 billion from each parent) was from Knome and their price dropped from $350,000 in 2008 to $99,000 in 2009. This inspects 3000-fold more bases of the genome than SNP chip-based genotyping, identifying both novel and known sequence variants, some relevant to personal health or ancestry. In June 2009, Illumina announced the launch of its own Personal Full Genome Sequencing Service at a depth of 30X for $48,000 per genome. In 2010, they cut the price to $19,500.

In 2009, Complete Genomics of Mountain View announced that it would provide full genome sequencing for $5,000, from June 2009. This will only be available to institutions, not individuals. Prices are expected to drop further over the next few years through economies of scale and increased competition. As of 2014, nearly complete exome sequencing was offered by Gentle for less than $2,000, including personal counseling along with the results. As of late 2018, over a million human genomes have been nearly completely sequenced for as little as $200 per person, and even under certain circumstances ultra-secure personal genomes for $0 each. In those two cases, the actual cost is reduced because the data can be monetized for researchers.

The decreasing cost in general of genomic mapping has permitted genealogical sites to offer it as a service, to the extent that one may submit one's genome to crowd sourced scientific endeavours such as OpenSNP or DNA.land at the New York Genome Center, as examples of citizen science. The Corpas family, led by scientist Manuel Corpas, developed the Corpasome project, and encouraged by the low prices in genome sequencing, was the first example of citizen science crowd sourced analysis of personal genomes.

The opening of genomic medical clinics at major US hospitals has raised questions about whether these services broaden existing inequities in the US healthcare system, including from practitioners such as Robert C. Green, director of the Preventive Genomics Clinic at Brigham and Women's Hospital.

== Ethical issues ==
Genetic discrimination is discriminating on the basis of information obtained from an individual's genome. Genetic non-discrimination laws have been enacted in some US states and at the federal level, by the Genetic Information Nondiscrimination Act (GINA). The GINA legislation prevents discrimination by health insurers and employers, but does not apply to life insurance or long-term care insurance. The passage of the Affordable Care Act in 2010 strengthened the GINA protections by prohibiting health insurance companies from denying coverage because of patient's "pre-existing conditions" and removing insurance issuers' ability to adjust premium costs based on certain factors such as genetic diseases. Given the ethical concerns about pre-symptomatic genetic testing of minors, it is likely that personal genomics will first be applied to adults who can provide consent to undergo such testing, although genome sequencing is already proving valuable for children if any symptoms are present.

There are also concerns regarding human genome research in developing countries. The tools for conducting whole genome analyses are generally found in high-income nations, necessitating partnerships between developed and developing countries in order to study the patients affected by certain diseases. The relevant tools for sharing access to the collected data are not equally accessible across low-income nations and without an established standard for this type of research, concerns over fairness to local researchers remain unsettled.

== Other issues ==
=== Genetic privacy ===
In the United States, biomedical research containing human subjects is governed by a baseline standard of ethics known as The Common Rule, which aims to protect a subject's privacy by requiring "identifiers" such as name or address to be removed from collected data. A 2012 report by the Presidential Commission for the Study of Bioethical Issues stated, however, that "what constitutes 'identifiable' and 'de-identified' data is fluid and that evolving technologies and the increasing accessibility of data could allow de-identified data to become re-identified." In fact, research has already shown that it is "possible to discover a study participant's identity by cross-referencing research data about him and his DNA sequence … [with] genetic genealogy and public-records databases." This has led to calls for policy-makers to establish consistent guidelines and best practices for the accessibility and usage of individual genomic data collected by researchers.

There is also controversy regarding the concerns with companies testing individual DNA. There are issues such as "leaking" information, the right to privacy and what responsibility the company has to ensure this does not happen. Regulation rules are not clearly laid out. What is still not determined is who legally owns the genome information: the company or the individual whose genome has been read. There have been published examples of personal genome information being exploited. Additional privacy concerns, related to, e.g., genetic discrimination, loss of anonymity, and psychological impacts, have been increasingly pointed out by the academic community as well as government agencies.

Additional issues arise from the trade-off between public benefit from research sharing and exposure to data escape and re-identification. The Personal Genome Project (started in 2005) is among the few to make both genome sequences and corresponding medical phenotypes publicly available.

=== Personalized genome utility ===
Full genome sequencing holds large promise in the world of healthcare in the potential of precise and personalized medical treatments. This use of genetic information to select appropriate drugs is known as pharmacogenomics. This technology may allow treatments to be catered to the individual and the certain genetic predispositions they may have (such as personalized chemotherapy). Among the most impactful and actionable uses of personal genome information is the avoidance of hundreds of severe single-gene genetic disorders which endanger about 5% of newborns (with costs up to 20 million dollars), for example elimination of Tay Sachs Disease via Dor Yeshorim. Another set of 59 genes vetted by the American College of Medical Genetics and Genomics (ACMG-59) are considered actionable in adults.

At the same time, full sequencing of the genome can identify polymorphisms that are so rare and/or mild sequence change that conclusions about their impact are challenging, reinforcing the need to focus on the reliable and actionable alleles in the context of clinical care. Czech medical geneticist Eva Machácková writes: "In some cases it is difficult to distinguish if the detected sequence variant is a causal mutation or a neutral (polymorphic) variation without any effect on phenotype. The interpretation of rare sequence variants of unknown significance detected in disease-causing genes becomes an increasingly important problem." In fact, researchers from the Exome Aggregation Consortium (ExAC) project estimated the average person to carry 54 genetic mutations that previously were assumed pathogenic, i.e. having 100% penetrance, but without any apparent negative health presentation.

As with other new technologies, doctors can order genomic tests for which some are not correctly trained to interpret the results. Many are unaware of how SNPs respond to one another. This results in presenting the client with potentially misleading and worrisome results which could strain the already overloaded health care system. In theory, this might antagonize an individual to make uneducated decisions such as unhealthy lifestyle choices and family planning modifications. Negative results which may potentially be inaccurate, theoretically decrease the quality of life and mental health of the individual (such as increased depression and extensive anxiety).

=== Direct-to-consumer genetics ===
Using microarrays for genotyping. The video shows the process of extracting genotypes from a human spit sample using microarrays as is done by most major direct-to-consumer genetics companies.

There are also three potential problems associated with the validity of personal genome kits. The first issue is the test's validity. Handling errors of the sample increases the likelihood for errors which could affect the test results and interpretation. The second affects the clinical validity, which could affect the test's ability to detect or predict associated disorders. The third problem is the clinical utility of personal genome kits and associated risks, and the benefits of introducing them into clinical practices.

People need to be educated on interpreting their results and what they should be rationally taking from the experience. Concerns about customers misinterpreting health information was one of the reasons for the 2013 shutdown by the FDA of 23&Me's health analysis services. It is not only the average person who needs to be educated in the dimensions of their own genomic sequence but also professionals, including physicians and science journalists, who must be provided with the knowledge required to inform and educate their patients and the public. Examples of such efforts include the Personal Genetics Education Project (pgEd), the Smithsonian collaboration with NHGRI, and the MedSeq, BabySeq and MilSeq projects of Genomes to People, an initiative of Harvard Medical School and Brigham and Women's Hospital.

A major use of personal genomics outside the realm of health is that of ancestry analysis (see Genetic Genealogy), including evolutionary origin information such as neanderthal content.

== Long-term genome storage ==
Long-term genome storage refers to the preservation of an individual's genomic data, often including raw sequence files such as FASTQ or VCF, over many years or decades for potential re-use in clinical or personal contexts. Unlike the short-term reports generated by direct-to-consumer testing companies, long-term storage services are designed to ensure that full genomic datasets remain accessible, verifiable, and secure. The primary motivation is the expectation that new clinical insights will emerge over time, allowing archived data to be re-analysed as variant classifications and gene–disease associations evolve. Individuals may also choose to retain genomic records for family planning, genetic counselling, or as part of their broader health archive.

Commercial and institutional systems emphasise data integrity through checksums and metadata verification, and they typically incorporate encryption, controlled access, and regulatory compliance to address privacy concerns. Some services allow users to share their data selectively with clinicians or researchers, often with audit trails to track access and consent. Retention plans may span multiple years or decades, with policies for migrating data to newer storage technologies. This approach is distinct from DNA data storage, in which synthetic DNA molecules are used as a medium for digital information, and from population-scale genome initiatives, which are designed for research or public health rather than individual custodianship.

The Personal Genome Project, initiated by George M. Church at Harvard University in 2005, is a long-term, large cohort study that sequences and publicises complete genomes and associated medical records of volunteers to enable research in personal genomics and personalised medicine. A related large-scale research initiative is the UK Biobank, which collects genomic and health data from over 500,000 participants and provides controlled access to approved researchers.

Since 2025, Switzerland Omics offers Genomic Vault as a private genome storage service dedicated solely to long-term storage and controlled sharing of individual genomic data. Unlike research-oriented projects such as the Personal Genome Project, which are primarily designed for open scientific use, Genomic Vault is positioned as a custodial system in which individuals or clinics retain control over access and re-use of their data.

== Popular culture ==
The 1997 science fiction film GATTACA presents a near-future society where personal genomics is readily available to anyone, and explores its societal impact. Perfect DNA is a novel that uses Dr Manuel Corpas' own experiences and expertise as genome scientist to begin exploring some of these issues.

== Other uses ==
In 2018, police arrested Joseph James DeAngelo, the prime suspect for the Golden State Killer or East Area Rapist, and William Earl Talbott II, the prime suspect in the murders of Jay Cook and Tanya Van Cuylenborg in 1987. These arrests were based on the personal genomics uploaded to an open-source database, GEDmatch, which allowed investigators to compare DNA recovered from crime scenes to the DNA uploaded to the database by relatives of the suspect. In December 2018, Family TreeDNA changed its terms of service to allow law enforcement to use their service to identify suspects of "a violent crime" or identify the remains of victims. The company confirmed it was working with the FBI on at least a handful of cases. Since then, nearly 50 suspects in crimes of assault, rape or murder have been arrested using the same method.

Personal genomics have also allowed investigators to identify previously unknown bodies using GEDmatch (the Buckskin Girl, Lyle Stevik and Joseph Newton Chandler III).

== See also ==
- Human genome – Complete set of nucleic acid sequences for humans
- Human Genome Project – International scientific research project (1990–2003)
- Single-nucleotide polymorphism – Single nucleotide in genomic DNA at which different sequence alternatives exist
- Population genomics – Large-scale comparison of DNA sequences
- Whole genome sequencing – Sequencing all the DNA of an individual at once
- Bioinformatics – Computational analysis of large, complex sets of biological data
- Genomics – Discipline in genetics
- Personalized medicine – Medical model that tailors medical practices to the individual patient
- Systems biology – Computational and mathematical modeling of complex biological systems
- TIARA (database) – Database of personal genomics information
- Transcriptomics technologies – Study of RNA transcripts
- Omics – Suffix in biology
- Population groups in biomedicine – Health based on racial identity
- Genomic counseling
- Fertility fraud – Non-consensual fertility treatments
- Personal medicine
- DNA encryption – Hiding or perplexing genetic information by a computational method
- Elective genetic and genomic testing – DNA tests performed without definite indication

== Bibliography ==
- Dudley & Karczewski (2013). Exploring Personal Genomics. Oxford University Press. ISBN 978-0-19-964449-0. Archived from the original on 1 December 2012.
- Sweet K; Michaelis R (May 2011). The Busy Physician's Guide to Genetics, Genomics and Personalized Medicine (1st ed.). Springer Scientific Press. ISBN 978-94-007-1147-1.
- Cadwalladr, Carole (8 June 2013). "What happened when I had my genome sequenced". The Guardian.
- Manuel Corpas (2016). Perfect DNA. CreateSpace Independent Publishing Platform. ISBN 978-1-5397-8372-5. ASIN 1539783723.
