= Shavenbaby =

Drosophila melanogaster gene

Transcriptional regulator ovo

Identifiers
- Organism: Drosophila melanogaster
- Symbol: ovo
- Orthologs: OMA: entry
- UniProt: P51521
Search for
- Structures: Swiss-model
- Domains: InterPro

The shavenbaby (svb) or ovo gene encodes a transcription factor in Drosophila responsible for inducing cells to become hair-like projections called trichomes or microtrichia. Many of the major developmental signaling pathways converge at the shavenbaby locus, which then regulates over 150 downstream target genes. The "hourglass" shape of this gene regulatory network makes shavenbaby the master regulator of trichome formation. The unique setup of the gene regulatory network made trichomes an excellent readout to identify important developmental genes during the forward genetics Heidelberg Screen. Additionally, shavenbaby is considered to be an "evolutionary hotspot", and experiments have shown that changes in this gene cause the loss of dorsal cuticular hairs in Drosophila sechellia larvae.

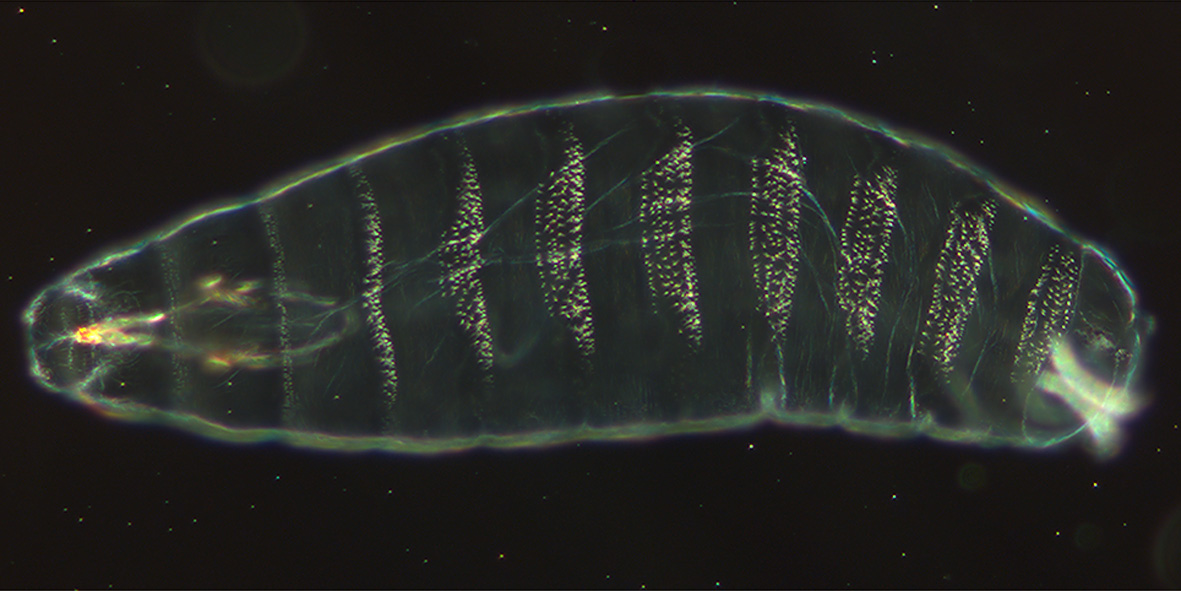
Drosophila larvae produce hair-like projections called trichomes. Production of trichomes is controlled by the shavenbaby gene.

Trichomes likely serve a variety of purposes. In larvae, trichomes likely help with larval locomotion. By alternating between bands of trichomes and naked cuticle, larvae can tread across different surfaces. Additionally, trichomes may contribute to hydrophobicity and even stabilize adult flight.

== Transcriptional inputs for svb ==
The shavenbaby locus is regulated by multiple signaling pathways, including the HOX factors, Wingless, EGF-R, Hedgehog, and Notch signaling. Additionally, the transcription factors SoxNeuro, Pointed, and Dichaete regulate shavenbaby expression.

=== Engrailed and Hedgehog activate EGFR ===
During stage 12 of embryonic development, Engrailed is expressed in a subset of cells, which activates the hedgehog signaling pathway. The Hedgehog signal is received by cells expressing Patched, which induces expression of rhomboid (rho) with Serrate-Notch signaling, which activates the EGFR signaling pathway. The drosophila EGF receptor (DER) is responsible for activating shavenbaby both directly and by driving expression of the factors SoxNeuro and Dichaete. Other transcription factors such as Ultrabithorax and its cofactor Homothorax also interact with the different shavenbaby enhancers to activate expression.

=== Wingless signaling represses shavenbaby ===
During stage 12, the Hedgehog signaling pathway induces expression of the Wingless signal. The Wingless signaling pathway is responsible for repressing shavenbaby activity, and cells expressing Wingless have naked cuticle. Furthermore, mutations to the Wingless gene produce a lawn of trichomes in the naked region. Wingless signaling has been characterized to specifically integrate at the shavenbaby E3 enhancer, which also produces a lawn of expression in Wingless mutants. Wingless signaling is repressed by both SoxNeuro and Dichaete, products of the EGFR signaling pathway.

Wingless represses shavenbaby expression, while Hedgehog signaling upregulates the EGFR pathway, which directly and indirectly activates shavenbaby and represses Wingless signaling.

== Developmental enhancers of svb ==
Developmental enhancers are DNA sequences which control the spatial-temporal patterning of genes during development to set up the bodyplan of an organism. Developmental enhancers are thought to be the main drivers of phenotypic evolution. There are currently seven putative developmental enhancers in the shavenbaby locus: DG2, DG3, Z1.3, A, E3, E6, and 7H. All of these enhancers are pleiotropic, expressing shavenbaby across different developmental stages. The enhancers are somewhat modular, where different patterning components are partitioned to different enhancers. However, many of the expression patterns overlap with each other making the enhancers seemingly redundant.

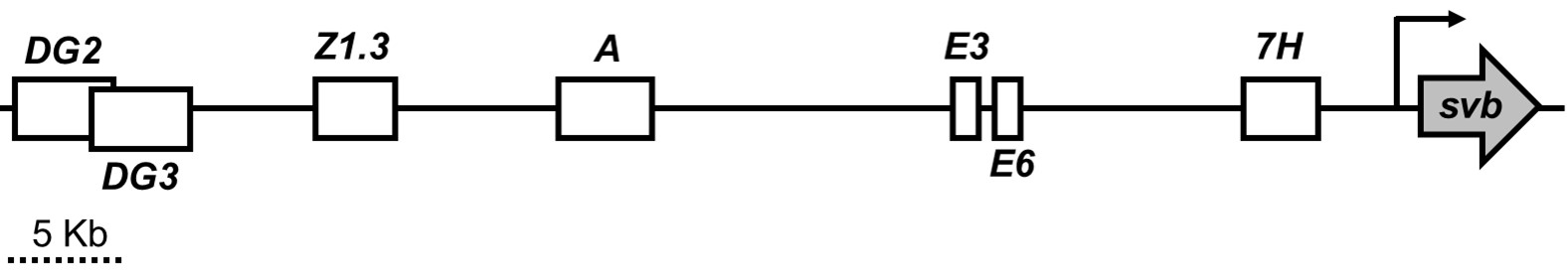
The shavenbaby locus is composed of seven putative developmental enhancers: DG2, DG3, Z1.3, A, E3, E6, and 7H. Each enhancer is pleiotropic across different developmental stages, semi-modular, and produces overlapping redundant expression patterns. This enhancer redundancy canalizes phenotypes under different environmental stresses and genetic backgrounds. The small black arrow is the transcription start site. The large gray arrow (not to scale) is the coding sequence.

Enhancer redundancy is a commonly observed phenomenon. Why would evolution evolve redundant enhancers? The mystery of enhancer redundancy was partially resolved by studying the shavenbaby locus in 2010. Frankel et al. found that the redundant enhancers help maintain proper shavenbaby expression under different temperature stresses, canalizing its expression. This finding was also observed eight years later for redundant mammalian enhancers, suggesting that this observation is not limited to Drosophila. Redundant enhancers have also been observed to use different transcription factors, incorporating a diverse set of signaling inputs to canalize gene expression under different environmental stresses.

=== The E3 enhancer ===
The E3 enhancer is a 1,042 base-pair (bp) enhancer which drives shavenbaby on the ventral side of stages 15 and 16+ embryos and larvae. E3 is also expressed pleiotropically in the pharynx and esophagus or third-instar larvae. In adult Drosophila, E3 is expressed in the abdomen, head, legs, and wing. The E3 fragment has been tested as smaller fragments such as E3-14 and E3N. Unlike the other shavenbaby enhancers, E3 activity is maintained in Drosophila sechellia.

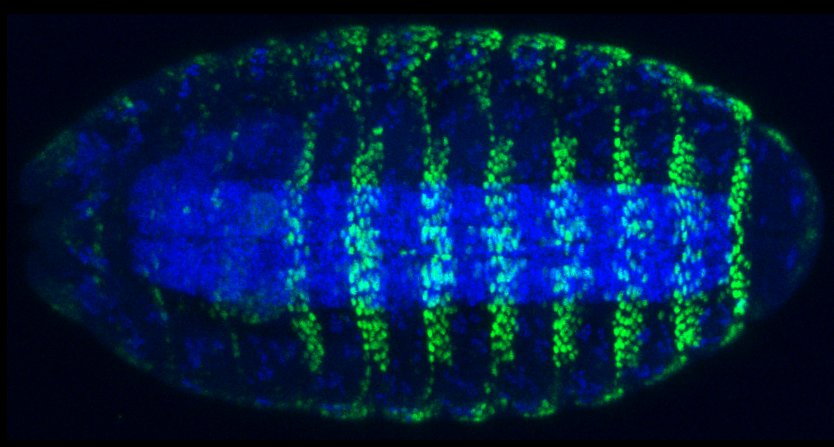
A confocal image of a Drosophila embryo stage 15/16. The embryo nuclei are stained blue (DAPI) and a reporter construct expressing the svb E3N enhancer is stained green. E3N marks cells which will become the ventral trichomes on the 1st instar larvae.

E3N was first described in Crocker et al., 2015, and was found to encode "homotypic clusters" of binding sites for the transcription factor: Ultrabithorax (Ubx). These binding sites, however, were non-canonical, and Ubx binds to E3N at a very low-affinity. Mutations to increase the affinity of these binding sites caused the ectopic binding of other Homeobox (HOX) factors, resulting in ectopic enhancer expression. HOX factors license the identity of cells, locking them into a fate to produce a particular structure such as wings, halteres, antennae, abdomen, etc. All of the HOX factors are evolutionarily related, and bind to the same homeodomain sequence: TAAT. How enhancers encode the specific binding of certain HOX factors and prevent the ectopic binding of others is called the "Hox Paradox". The E3N study from Crocker et al., 2015 provided an answer to the "Hox Paradox", by suggesting that low-affinity binding sites would provide the specificity, and encoding clusters of the sites would account for the potential weak activation. Low-affinity transcription factor binding sites have also been observed in other enhancers.

In a follow-up study, Fuqua et al. created a library of random mutants to the E3N enhancer to study the enhancer grammar and how enhancers can evolve. The study revealed that even single point mutations had a significant effect on the enhancer expression pattern. Furthermore, the mutations affected multiple components of the pattern. This pleiotropic nature of the mutations was demonstrated when the emergence of novel salivary gland or mouth hook expression was linked with the nearly complete loss of the original embryonic expression pattern. Additionally, changes to the low-affinity Ultrabithorax binding sites resulted in pleiotropic effects modulating the timing, pattern intensity, and ectopic expression. The authors concluded that enhancers are densely encoded with regulatory information and enhancer mutations are usually pleiotropic. Other recent studies in the yellow spot enhancer and the Sonic Hedgehog ZRS enhancer also support this claim. These findings may even suggest that the underlying cis-regulatory logic of an enhancer may constrain its evolution, a claim also made my Preger Ben-Noon et al.

=== The E6 enhancer ===
The E6 enhancer is expressed in the dorsal and quaternary cells of Drosophila embryos, larvae, and in the pupal epidermis. The E6 enhancer is one of the five enhancers that contributed to the loss of the larval dorsal trichomes in Drosophila sechellia. The molecular mechanism for this loss of expression was resolved by Preger Ben-Noon et al., where sechellia-E6 consecutively accumulated mutations in activator sites for Arrowhead and Pannier and gained a binding site for the repressor Abrupt. These mutations contributed to a 46% decrease in total embryonic shavenbaby expression, and affected the pleiotropic expression in the pupal epidermis.

=== The Z1.3 enhancer ===
The Z1.3 enhancer is a minimized fragment of the Z enhancer, and drives expression in the embryonic quaternary cells, the larval pharynx and proventriculus, and the pupal epidermis. The Z1.3 enhancer contributed to an estimated 28% loss of total embryonic expression in Drosophila sechellia. However, unlike in E6, the mutations that affected the embryonic pattern of Z1.3 had no effect on its pleiotropic pupal epidermis expression. Preger Ben-Noon et al. further dissected the Z1.3 enhancer and were able to minimize the pleiotropic activity into two separate enhancers: Z0.3 and Z1.3R.

=== The DG3 enhancer ===
The DG3 enhancer is primarily expressed in the ventral embryonic epidermis along with E3N and 7H. In larvae, DG3 is expressed in the dorsal and ventral regions, in the pharynix, esophagus, and proventriculus, and in the pupal epidermis. A closer look at the ventral nuclei reveals that the shavenbaby gene physically colocalizes with higher concentrations of the Ultrabithorax protein and its cofactor Homothorax. Additionally, the Drosophila line Df(svb)108 contains a deletion in the DG2, DG3, and Z enhancers. Heat shocking these lines does induce a slight decrease in the number of ventral trichomes. A closer look at the nuclei of these individual cells reveals both lower quanitifiable levels of the shavenbaby transcript and weaker nuclear microenvironment interactions between the ventral enhancers . Interestingly, transcript levels and the microenvironment can be stabilized by crossing flies carrying the deletion with flies carrying an artificial BAC of the shavenbaby locus. The studies from Tsai et al. reveals microenvironments and potentially transvection to be potential mechanisms for how redundant enhancers canalize gene expression.

=== The 7H enhancer ===
The 7H enhancer drives expression in both the ventral and dorsal embryonic and larval epidermis, the larval pharynx, and the pupal epidermis. Deletion of the 7H enhancer results in a 38% decrease in total embryonic shavenbaby expression. 7H, DG3, and E3N are the primary ventral enhancers in the embryo.

== Trichome formation ==
Shavenbaby activates over 150 different downstream targets to express actin-remodeling proteins to form the denticle. Some of these factors include forked, shavenoid, singed, wasp, yellow, and miniature. Activation of these target genes is also dependent on SoxNeuro, one of the regulators of shavenbaby. Together, SoxNeuro and Shavenbaby act cooperatively to shape the denticles.
