= National Taiwan University Press =

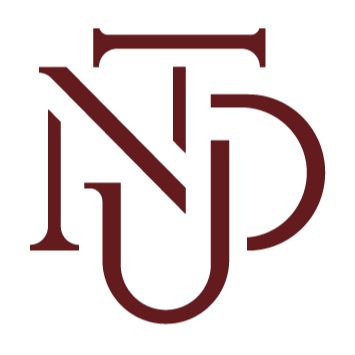
- Parent company: National Taiwan University
- Founded: 1996; 30 years ago
- Country of origin: Taiwan
- Headquarters location: Taipei, Taiwan
- Publication types: Academic journals; books
- Official website: press.ntu.edu.tw/index_en.php

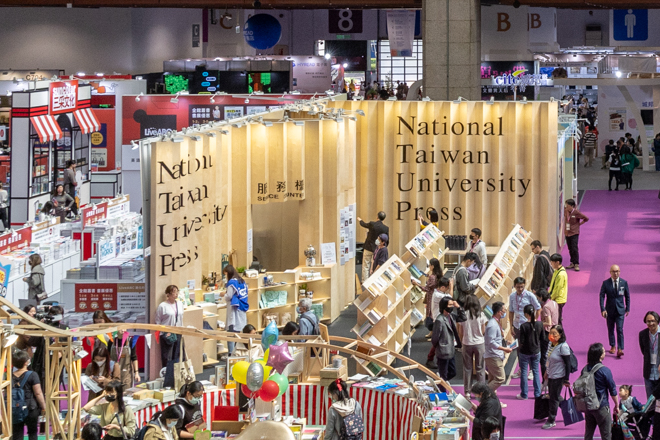
National Taiwan University Press at the 2024 Taipei International Book Exhibition

The National Taiwan University Press (NTU Press; Chinese: 國立臺灣大學出版中心) is the university press of National Taiwan University, a national university in Taipei, Taiwan. It primarily publishes academic works and textbooks, mostly in traditional Chinese and English. In addition to books, NTU Press also sells stationery and souvenirs produced by the university. The company was established in October 1996, and the headquarters is now located in Chengsi Building, Shuiyuan Campus, National Taiwan University.

== History ==
The National Taiwan University Press was founded in 1996. Its predecessor was the publishing group of the educational department of the university. It soon developed into a leading academic press in Taiwan.

At the 2022 Taipei International Book Exhibition, the NTU Press impressed the visitors with its professional publications and excellent souvenirs.

So far, NTU Press has published more than seven hundred titles, including scholarly works, textbooks, general readings, and multimedia publications.

== Bookstores and distribution ==
National Taiwan University Press has three bookstores, including the Gallery of NTU History Bookstore, the Main Campus Bookstore and the Shuiyuan Campus Bookstore. Online platforms are also available for global distribution. In addition, there is the National Taiwan University Journals Database and E-Book Publication.

The NTU Press also helmed the annual Taipei International Book Exhibition many times.

== Academic cooperation ==
NTU Press has close cooperation with Academia Sinica for academic publication, especially with its Institutes of Chinese Literature and Philosophy, Sociology and Taiwan History. International cooperation is another priority for NTU Press. For example, six Mandarin-language books have been published for the NTU Harvard-Yenching Institute Academic Series.

== See also ==
- National Taiwan University
- Commercial Press (Taiwan)
- Chung Hwa Book Company (Taiwan)
