= Ting Wu =

American geneticist

Chao-ting Wu
- 吳昭婷
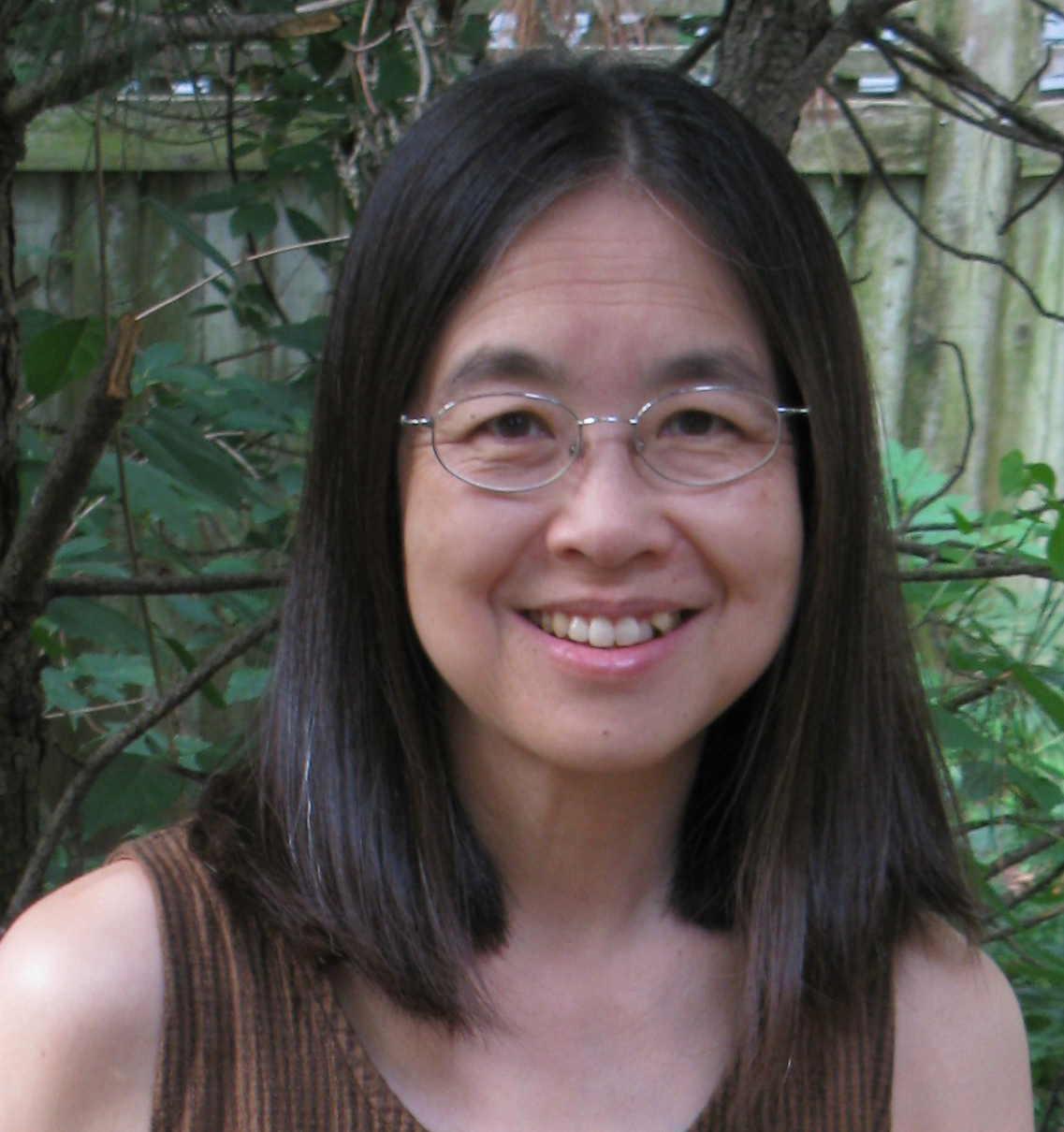
- Wu 8-Jul-2010
- Born: January 24, 1954 (age 72); New Haven, Connecticut, U.S.
- Education: Harvard University (BS, PhD)
- Awards: National Institutes of Health Director's Pioneer Award
- Scientific career
- Fields: Genetics, homology effects
- Workplaces: Harvard University
- Thesis: (1984)
- Doctoral advisor: William Gelbart
- Website: www.homologyeffects.org

Chao-ting Wu (Chinese: 吳昭婷; pinyin: Wú Zhāotíng; born January 24, 1954) is an American molecular biologist. After training at Harvard Medical School in genetics with William Gelbart, at Stanford Medical School with David Hogness, and in a fellowship at Massachusetts General Hospital in molecular biology, Wu began her independent academic career as an assistant professor in anatomy and cellular biology and then genetics at Harvard Medical School in 1993. After a period as a professor of pediatrics in the division of molecular medicine at the Boston Children's Hospital, she returned to the Department of Genetics at Harvard Medical School as a full professor in 2007.

Wu's research has focused on the role of chromosome behavior gene activity and inheritance, with emphasis on widespread homology effects, phenomena in which homology between chromosomes plays a role. Her studies have explored transvection in genetics, polycomb-group genes, chromatin pairing and remodeling, and the mechanisms of bridging promoter and enhancer elements within and between chromosomes. She also studies ultra-conserved elements (UCEs), proposing that these highly conserved sequences play a role in maintaining genome integrity, and has discussed potential opportunities for therapeutics harnessing properties of UCEs in many venues, including in TEDx and the Google-sponsored Solve for X program.

Wu has made significant contributions in the area of science education in genetics, across many age groups, through work with the Smithsonian Institution and the National Museum of Natural History and is founding director of the Personal Genetics Education Project, which works through schools, online curricula, teacher training, and producers and writers of the television and movie industry through involvement with the trade-supporting organization Hollywood, Health, & Society. She is daughter of author Nelson Ikon Wu, sister of actor Ping Wu, and colleague and spouse of Harvard and MIT scientist George M. Church.

== Training and career ==
Wu attended Mary Institute (now Mary Institute and St. Louis Country Day School, MICDS) in St. Louis, Missouri, from 1968 to 1972 and then completed her undergraduate BS degree in biology at Harvard University. She obtained her Ph.D. degree in 1984 from Harvard Medical School in Genetics and then following a brief period at Stanford Medical School with David Hogness, set up a non-profit research institute in Cheshire, Connecticut, called the Station for Natural Studies Inc., which received grant funding from the Whitehall Foundation and the Helen Hay Whitney Foundation. She was affiliated with nearby Yale University during this time.

Wu was a fellow at Massachusetts General Hospital in the Department of Molecular Biology from 1987 to 1991. She moved to Harvard Medical School's main campus as an assistant professor in the Department of Anatomy and Cellular Biology and then joined the Department of Genetics, also at Harvard Medical School, in 1993. In 2005, she left the Department of Genetics to become a professor of pediatrics in the Division of Molecular Medicine at the Boston Children's Hospital. She returned to the Department of Genetics at Harvard Medical School as a full professor in 2007.

== Research ==
Since 1980, Wu's research has focused on the role of chromosome behavior in inheritance and gene activity, with emphasis on the widespread phenomena in which homology between chromosomes plays a role. She coined the term "homology effects" to highlight these phenomena. Her studies explore transvection, the zeste gene, chromosome pairing, and Polycomb-group genes and chromatin remodeling. She has also characterized the mechanisms of bridging promoter and enhancer elements within and between chromosomes.

As stated by nobelist Ed Lewis, "Operationally, transvection is occurring if the phenotype of a given genotype can be altered solely by disruption of somatic (or meiotic) pairing. Such disruption can generally be accomplished by introduction of a heterozygous rearrangement that disrupts pairing in the relevant region but has no position effect of its own on the phenotype"

She also studies ultra-conserved elements (UCEs). Her lab has proposed that these highly conserved sequences may play a role in maintaining genome integrity.

== Honors and leadership roles ==
Wu was one of ten people in the US to receive the National Institutes of Health Director's Pioneer Award in 2012. She has also received awards for teaching and mentoring at Harvard University and Harvard Medical School.

She has chaired the 2005 Epigenetics Gordon Research Conference, the 2003 FASEB Conference on Chromatin and Transcription, and the GETed Conferences.

== Technology development ==
Ting Wu has four patents pending on topics related to biomedical research and health applications "Oligonucleotide Trapping" (2013), "High-Throughput In Situ Hybridization" (2012), "Methods For Sequencing Nucleic Acid Molecules" (2012), and "Oligonucleotide Paints" (2010).

She has been interviewed by the Boston Globe on the topic of inventors. In the context of TEDx and Google "Solve for X" she has discussed potential opportunities for therapeutics harnessing properties of UCEs.

== Genetics education ==
She has worked with the Smithsonian and the National Museum of Natural History as part of the exhibit on "Genome: Unlocking Life's Code" which opened June 14, 2013.

She is founding director of the Personal Genetics Education Project (pgEd; link), which works through schools, online curricula, teacher training, and producers and writers of the television and movie industry through Hollywood, Health & Society of the Norman Lear Center and the National Academy of Sciences' program on Science & Entertainment Exchange. Her work with Hollywood Health and Society and Grey's Anatomy brings accurate and engaging information about genetics to a broader audience.

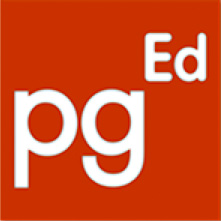
PgEd Logo

In bringing genetics directly to high school students across a broad socioeconomic spectrum throughout the US and in workshops with high school and college teachers, she uses empirically engaging topics like prenatal diagnosis and the biological challenges of Mars colonization.

She is featured in the documentary series "Genome: The Future is Now", produced by Marilyn Ness of Necessary Films.

== Personal life ==
Ting Wu is married to fellow Harvard Medical School faculty in genetics, George M. Church.
