= Wei Yang Ge =

Novel by Lu Qiao

Wei Yang Ge (Chinese: 未央歌; pinyin: Wèiyānggē; lit. 'not ended song'), also translated as "Endless Song " or "Never-ending Saga", is a novel by the Chinese-American writer Lu Qiao. It was completed in 1945 and published in Taiwan by the Commercial Press in 1967, achieving a sales record of 500,000 copies and 50 printings in the later years. And there is a song of the same name based on the story of this work.

== Overview ==
This work is set in the Southwest Associated University in Kunming, Yunnan, during the Anti-Japanese War and describes the life and ideals of young students. It does not attract readers with major themes or twists and turns in the plot, but with an optimistic mood and friendly philosophy. Taiwanese singer Huang Shujun once wrote a song of the same name based on the story of this work.

Wei Yang Ge was completed by Lu Qiao in 1945 and not published in Hong Kong until 1959. It was published by the Commercial Press in Taiwan in 1967 and became popular on university campuses in the 1960s and 1970s, achieving a sales record of 500,000 copies and 50 printings in the following 30 years. The Latest Edition of Wei Yang Ge [Collector's Edition] by the Commercial Press was published on June 1, 2022. The book has also been published in China mainland.

== Main characters ==
The main characters of Wei Yang Ge include:

Lin Yanmei, a student in the Department of Foreign Languages, was born into a wealthy family but treated others equally. She has an innocent and simple personality and is good at dancing and singing. She once sang "Three Wishes of a Rose" in front of the entire school and is extremely popular on campus.

Tong Xiaoxian, a biology student, is sincere, lively, and loves animals.

Wu Baosheng, a biology student, is gentle, calm, and intelligent, portraying a warm older sister in the book.

Yu Mengqin, a philosophy student, has been described as a candidate for Lin Yanmei.

In addition to the four main characters, the book also depicts many other kind-hearted people in society, forming a world of friendship where people meet in the midst of war, meet in foreign lands, and share hardships.

== Author ==
Nelson Ikon Wu was born in Peking. He earned a bachelor's degree from the National Southwestern Associated University in Kunming in 1942 and came to the United States in 1945. He attended The New School for Social Research before earning a master's degree in 1949 and doctorate in 1954 in art history from Yale University.

Wu was a scholar of Asian art and architecture. He taught at Yale, San Francisco State University, and Kyoto University in Japan and Washington University in St. Louis. He was also a best-selling author in China and Taiwan, occasionally using his pen name Lu Ch'iao (Lu Qiao, 鹿桥). His first novel Wei Yang Ge was voted most influential book of the 1950s by readers of the China Times, Taiwan's largest daily newspaper and ranked number 73 for 20th century Chinese novels.

Wu died of cancer in Boston on March 19, 2002, at the age of 84.

== See also ==
- Commercial Press (Taiwan)
- Nelson Ikon Wu
