= HIVEP2 =

Protein-coding gene in the species Homo sapiens

Identifiers
- Aliases: HIVEP2, HIV-EP2, MBP-2, MIBP1, SHN2, ZAS2, ZNF40B, human immunodeficiency virus type I enhancer binding protein 2, MRD43
- External IDs: OMIM: 143054; MGI: 1338076; GeneCards: HIVEP2

Gene location (Human)
Chr.	Chromosome 6 (human)
Band	6q24.2	Start	142,751,467 bp
Band	6q24.2	End	142,956,698 bp

Gene location (Mouse)
Chr.	Chromosome 10 (mouse)
Band	10|10 A2	Start	13,966,075 bp
Band	10|10 A2	End	14,151,374 bp
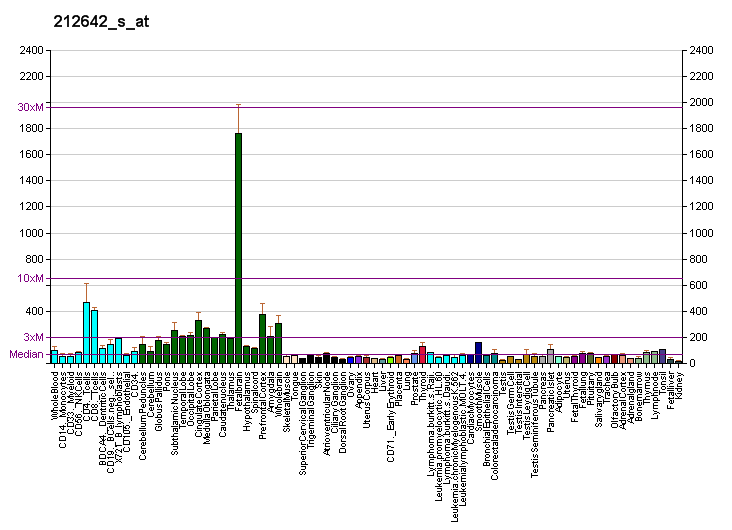

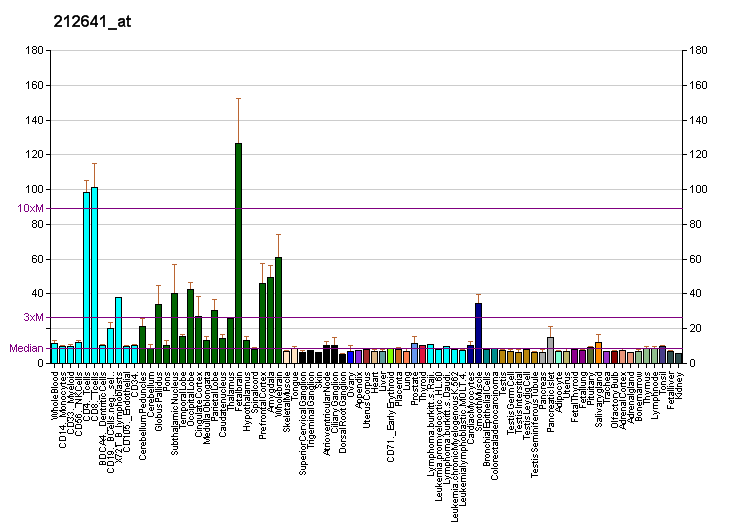
RNA expression pattern
Bgee	Human / Mouse (ortholog); Top expressed in: tendon of biceps brachii; vena cava; lateral nuclear group of thalamus; saphenous vein; frontal pole; synovial joint; pons; cerebellar vermis; body of tongue; endothelial cell / Top expressed in: primary motor cortex; Region I of hippocampus proper; prefrontal cortex; barrel cortex; aortic valve; visual cortex; perirhinal cortex; subiculum; primary visual cortex; hippocampus proper; More reference expression data
BioGPS	More reference expression data
Gene ontology
Molecular function	DNA-binding transcription factor activity; DNA binding; sequence-specific DNA binding; metal ion binding; nucleic acid binding; DNA-binding transcription factor activity, RNA polymerase II-specific
Cellular component	nucleus; nucleoplasm
Biological process	multicellular organism development; regulation of transcription, DNA-templated; transcription by RNA polymerase II; signal transduction; transcription, DNA-templated; regulation of transcription by RNA polymerase II
Sources:Amigo / QuickGO
Orthologs
Databases	NCBI: entry; OMA: entry
Species	Human	Mouse
Entrez	3097	15273
Ensembl	ENSG00000010818	ENSMUSG00000015501
UniProt	P31629	Q3UHF7
RefSeq (mRNA)	NM_006734	NM_010437; NM_001358782; NM_001358783
RefSeq (protein)	NP_006725	NP_034567; NP_001345711; NP_001345712
Location (UCSC)	Chr 6: 142.75 – 142.96 Mb	Chr 10: 13.97 – 14.15 Mb
PubMed search
- Wikidata
View/Edit Human	View/Edit Mouse

Transcription factor HIVEP2 is a protein that in humans is encoded by the HIVEP2 gene.

== Function ==
Members of the ZAS family, such as ZAS2 (HIVEP2), are large proteins that contain a ZAS domain, a modular protein structure consisting of a pair of C2H2 zinc fingers with an acidic-rich region and a serine/threonine-rich sequence. These proteins bind specific DNA sequences, including the kappa-B motif (GGGACTTTCC), in the promoters and enhancer regions of several genes and viruses, including human immunodeficiency virus (HIV). ZAS genes span more than 150 kb and contain at least 10 exons, one of which is longer than 5.5 kb (Allen and Wu, 2004).[supplied by OMIM]
