= Chung Hwa Book Company (Taiwan) =

Taiwanese publisher

Chung Hwa Book Company, Limited (中華書局股份有限公司)
- Company type: Limited by Shares
- Industry: Publishing industry, information software services industry
- Founded: January 1, 1912; 114 years ago Republic of China Fuzhou Road, Shanghai County
- Founder: Lu Feikui, Chen Yin, Dai Kejing, Shen Yi and others
- Headquarters: Republic of China 5F, No. 8, Lane 181, Section 2, Jiuzong Road, Neihu District, Taipei City
- Key people: Zhang Minjun (Current Representative)
- Products: Educational books and stationery
- Number of employees: 20
- Website: www.chunghwabook.com.tw

Chung Hwa Book Company (Taiwan), or Taiwan Zhonghua Book Company, Officially Chung Hwa Book Company, Limited (Chinese: 中華書局股份有限公司), is a private company engaged in book publishing and distribution in Taiwan. Its headquarters is located in Taipei City. The company was founded in Shanghai on January 1, 1912, the same day when the Republic of China was founded.

== Early Years in China ==
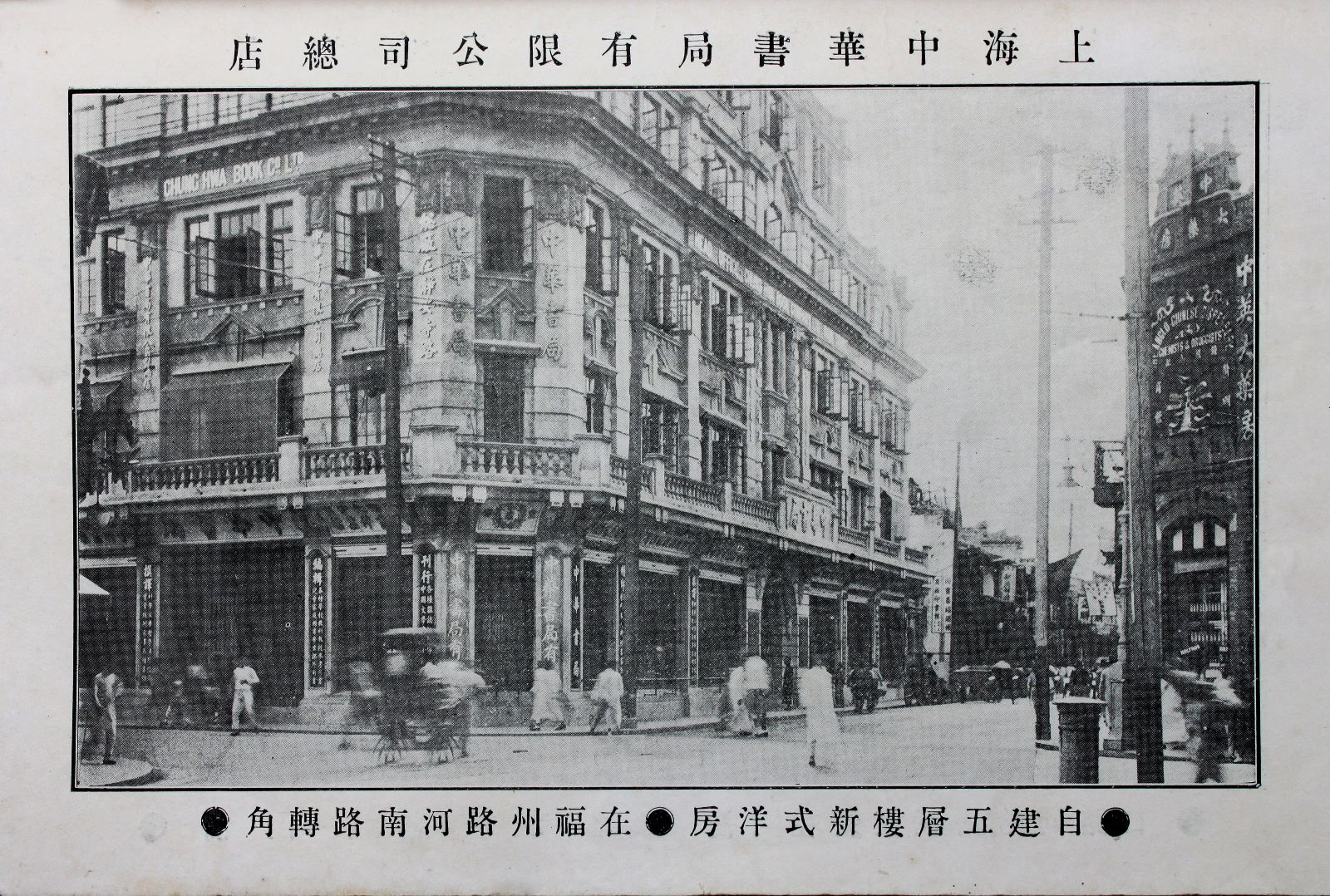
The Zhonghua Book Company Building on Fuzhou Road in Shanghai, built in 1916

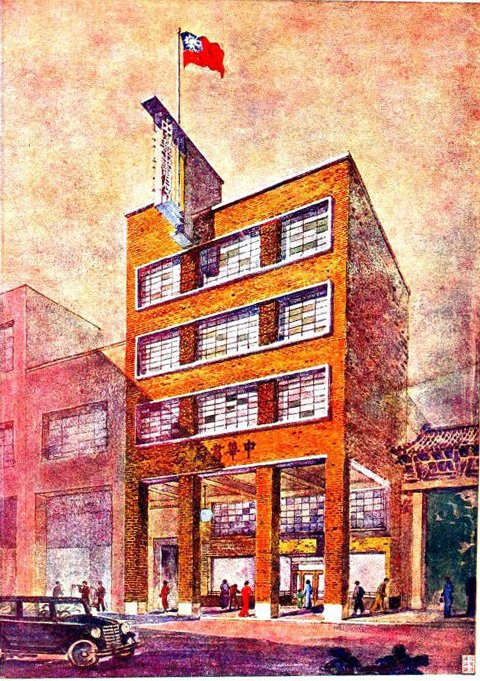
The original site of the Zhonghua Book Company's Guangzhou branch

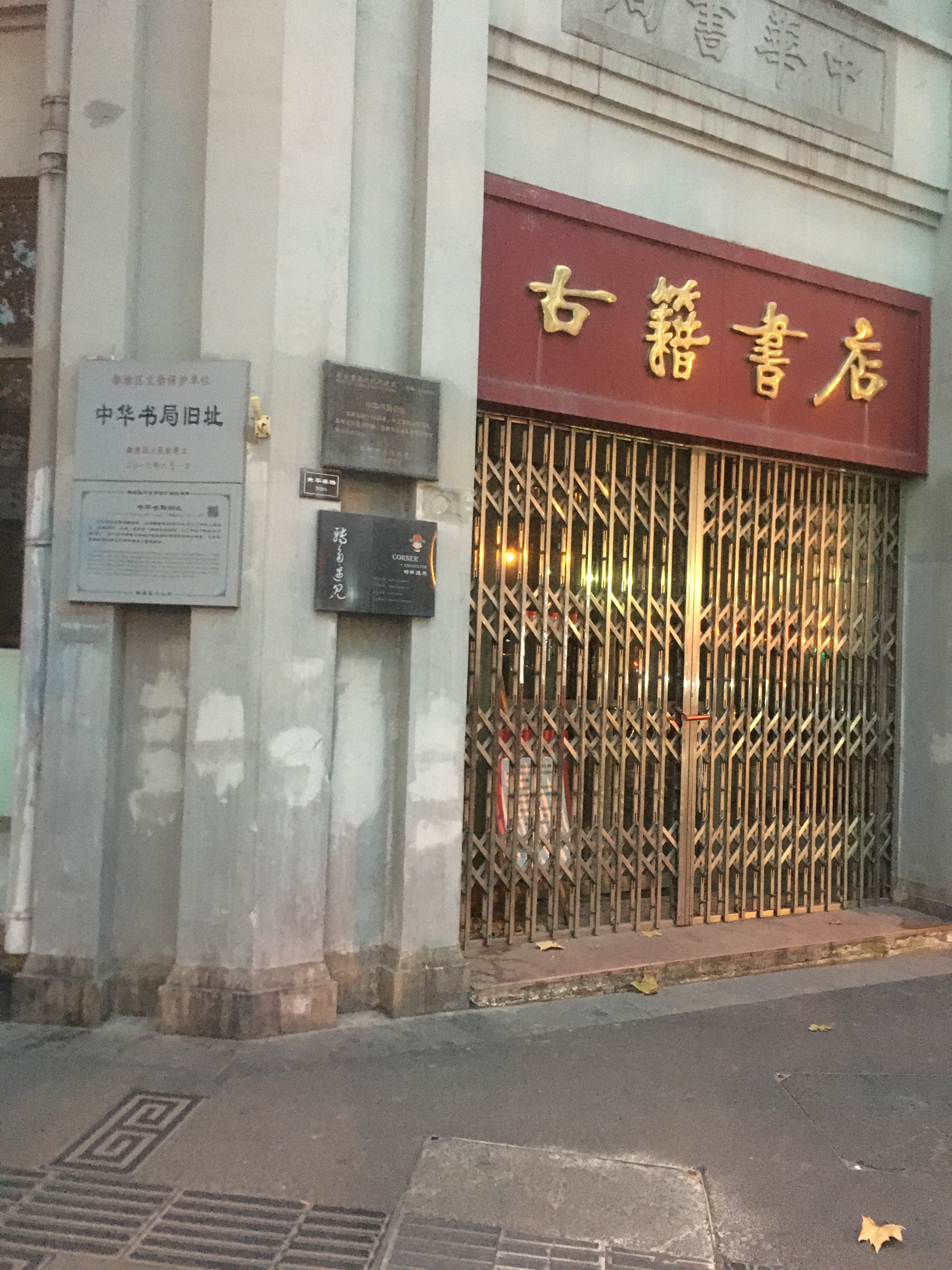
The former site of the Zhonghua Book Company in Nanjing

On the eve of the 1911 Revolution, Lu Feikui, the director of the Publishing Department of the Commercial Press, and Dai Kedun, Chen Yin and others invited editors to secretly compile new textbooks.

On January 1, 1912, Zhonghua Book Company was founded in Shanghai by Lu Feikui, Chen Yin, Dai Kedun, Shen Yi and others. Its purpose was to "promote Chinese culture and popularize education for the people." The slogans of "textbook revolution" and "completely run by Chinese businessmen" was to compete with the Commercial Press. The first published Zhonghua Textbook seized most of the textbook market with its national flag pattern.

In 1913, the British Hong Kong branch and the Singapore branch of Zhonghua Book Company were established. There were three large printing plants, one of which was the Hong Kong Banknote Printing Department. It had the world's newest and largest embossing machine at the time, specializing in printing embossing plates, such as securities, banknotes, stamps and tax stamps, and was well-known at home and abroad, making an indelible contribution to the cultural world. Later, Wenming Book Company, Minli Book Company and Juzhen Fangsong Printing House were merged into Zhonghua Book Company, and it quickly developed into the second largest private publishing organization in China at that time, with more than 40 branches in major cities across the Republic of China, such as Nanjing, Hangzhou, Guangzhou, Taiyuan, Tianjin, Peking, Qingdao, Chongqing, Wuzhou.

Zhonghua Book Company first devoted itself to publishing primary school, middle school and normal school textbooks. Later, it began to compile reference books such as dictionaries for teaching and students' studies. At that time, Zhonghua Book Company attracted a large number of experts, scholars, and celebrities including Liang Qichao, Yu Youren, Fan Yuanlian, Ma Junwu, Tian Han, Zhang Wentian, Pan Hannian and Xu Zhimo. The company published influential works such as the Zhonghua Da Zidian, Cihai, Sibu Beiyao, and Gujin Tushu Jicheng. During the Chinese Civil War, they participated in the printing and distribution of Chinese gold yuan banknotes.

Zhonghua Book Company primarily published the Twenty-Four Histories and an annotated edition of the Draft History of Qing, as well as the Quan shanggu Sandai Qin Han Sanguo Liuchao wen, Poetry of the Pre-Qin, Han, Wei, Jin, and Southern and Northern Dynasties, Complete Tang Prose, Complete Tang Poems, Complete Song Ci, Collection of Ancient Novels, Jiaguwen Heji, Complete Collection of Yin and Zhou Bronze Inscriptions, Zizhi Tongjian, Wenyuan Yinghua, Taiping Yulan, Yongle Encyclopedia, and Cefu Yuangui. In addition, the magazines published by Zhonghua Book Company were very popular and were known as the "Eight Major Magazines", including the "China Education Circle", "China Fiction Circle", "China Industrial Circle", "China Children's Circle", "China Children's Pictorial", "Greater China", "China Women's Circle" and "China Student Circle".

The Zhonghua Book Company Editorial Department had a book collection building, which was opened in 1916 and renamed the "Zhonghua Book Company Library" in 1925.

=== Second Sino-Japanese War ===
During the Second Sino-Japanese War, the Oriental Library of the Commercial Press was burned down by fire. The Zhonghua Book Company Library became the one with the largest collection of books among the libraries attached to private publishing institutions. At that time, the Zhonghua Book Company library had a collection of more than 500,000 books, including series, encyclopedias, local chronicles, calligraphy and painting, reference books, textbooks, newspapers and magazines, etc. In February 1942, the Zhonghua Book Company General Administration Office was established in Chongqing to ensure that the book publishing work would not be affected. In 1945, the Zhonghua Book Company established a branch in Taiwan to sell original books. In June 1946, the Zhonghua Book Company General Administration Office moved back to Shanghai from Chongqing.

From 1912 to 1949, Zhonghua Book Company published about 6,000 various types of books, including textbooks, ancient books, dictionaries, magazines, new books on various subjects, children's books, foreign language books, calligraphy and painting, etc.

== Move to Taiwan (1951) ==
In August 1949, the Zhonghua Book Company General Administration Office moved to Taipei City and officially started its office in Taiwan. In 1951, Zhonghua Book Company registered its shareholders in Taiwan. On September 19, 1952, the Ministry of Economic Affairs of the Republic of China approved the registration and establishment of "Taiwan Zhonghua Book Company Co., Ltd." On July 23, 1980, the Ministry of Economic Affairs approved the change of the name of Taiwan Zhonghua Book Company to "Zhonghua Book Company Co., Ltd." In 1993, the Zhonghua Book Company broke through the traditional bookstore model and created the first "House of Biography", a unique themed bookstore in Taiwan. The company has published a total of more than 2,500 books in Taiwan.

=== Decline and revitalization ===
In the early 21st century, the information revolution led to changes in people's reading habits. The Zhonghua Book Company temporarily suspended its book publishing business and readjusted its business operations, which was then resumed.

On May 1, 2018, the Zhonghua Book Company officially put on sale new books on language and literature, including the Chinese and English versions of Selected Translations of Tang Poems by Lin Yutang's daughter Adet Lin, Xie Wuliang's Guide to Poetry and Guide to Ci Studies, Lu Jiaji's Idle Talks on Ancient Prose and Interesting Talks on Ci Poems. The publications of the Zhonghua Book Company also include the Chinese translation of English novel Gone with the Wind and its sequel, the traditional Chinese version of the Encyclopedia Britannica, and other books such as The Confucian Merchant by Cai Shiding, the founder of the Pacific Hotel Group. In April 2024, the Zhonghua Book Company published three volumes of Walking Alone in a Thousand Mountains - Collection of Ancient Poems and Prose by the Chinese-Canadian poet Wen Ren.

== See also ==
- Chung Hwa Book Company (Hong Kong)
- Zhonghua Book Company (Beijing)
- Commercial Press (Taiwan)
