= Personal Genetics Education Project =

Project advocating learning about one's genome

The Personal Genetics Education Project (pgEd) aims to engage and inform a worldwide audience about the benefits of knowing one's genome as well as the ethical, legal and social issues (ELSI) and dimensions of personal genetics. pgEd was founded in 2006, is housed in the Department of Genetics at Harvard Medical School and is directed by Ting Wu, a professor in that department. It employs a variety of strategies for reaching general audiences, including generating online curricular materials, leading discussions in classrooms, workshops, and conferences, developing a mobile educational game (Map-Ed), holding an annual conference geared toward accelerating awareness (GETed), and working with the world of entertainment to improve accuracy and outreach.

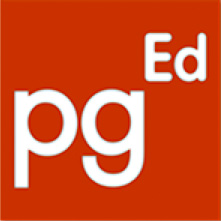
pgEd Logo

== Online curricular materials and professional development for teachers ==
pgEd develops tools for teachers and general audiences that examine the potential benefits and risks of personalized genome analysis. These include freely accessible, interactive lesson plans that tackle issues such as genetic testing of minors, reproductive genetics, complex human traits and genetics, and the history of eugenics. pgEd also engages educators at conferences as well as organizes professional development workshops. All of pgEd's materials are freely available online.

== Map-Ed, a mobile quiz ==
In 2013, pgEd created a mobile educational quiz called Map-Ed. Map-Ed invites players to work their way through five questions that address key concepts in genetics and then pin themselves on a world map. Within weeks of its launch, Map-Ed gained over 1,000 pins around the world, spanning across all 7 continents. Translations and new maps linked to questions on topics broadly related to genetics are in development.

== GETed conference ==
pgEd hosts the annual GETed conference, a meeting that brings together experts from across the United States and beyond in education, research, health, entertainment, and policy to develop strategies for accelerating public awareness. Topics covered during these conferences have included reproductive technologies, human behavior and cognition, microbiomes, the intersection of faith and genetics, interplanetary travel, the importance of engaging the political sphere, and the power of entertainment and gaming to reach millions.

== Education and Entertainment Interface ==
pgEd is working with Sandra de Castro Buffington and Hollywood, Health & Society at the Norman Lear Center, University of Southern California (USC) Annenberg School for Communication, to advance awareness about personal genetics through television. They have also worked with the Broad Institute on outreach via fiction.

== Advisory board ==
pgEd's advisory board includes Sandra de Castro Buffington, Director, Hollywood Health and Society, George M. Church, Professor of Genetics, Harvard Medical School, Juan Enriquez, Managing Director at Excel Venture Management, and Marc Hodosh, Co-Creator of TEDMED.

== See also ==
- Personal genomics
- Genomic counseling
