= Ping Wu =

American actor (born 1956)

- Born: June 16, 1956 (age 70); New Haven, Connecticut, U.S.
- Education: Washington University in St. Louis
- Occupation: Actor
- Years active: 1985–present
- Relatives: Nelson Ikon Wu (father); Ting Wu (sister)

Ping Wu (born May 16, 1956) is an American television and film actor.

== Personal life ==
Wu is Chinese–American. His father was author and educator Nelson Ikon Wu, and his sister, Ting Wu, is a genetics professor at the Harvard Medical School.

== Career ==
Wu is best known for the recurring role of Ping, the delivery boy, on the comedy television series Seinfeld. He has appeared on other sitcoms, such as Everybody Loves Raymond, How I Met Your Mother, Two and a Half Men, The King of Queens, Anger Management, and Rules of Engagement. He appeared in the 1988 TV mini-series, Noble House, Rock Hudson and The Adventures of Young Indiana Jones: Journey of Radiance. He played a Japanese officer in the 2001 film Pearl Harbor, as well as a physician in the 1991 medical drama The Doctor.

He appeared in three episodes of the fourth season of 24.

He appeared in an episode of Californication; and has been featured in several television commercials.

He appeared in Fresh Off The Boat and has a recurring role as Henry on Silicon Valley.

Wu has also worked as a voice actor in the video game Fallout 4.

He was in an episode of 21 Jump Street.

== Filmography ==
| Year | Title | Role | Notes |
|---|---|---|---|
| 1985 | Police Story | Chan Ka Kui | 1998 English version, voice (uncredited) |
| 1987 | Project A Part II | Sergeant Dragon Ma Yue Lung | 2003 English version, voice (uncredited) |
| 1987 | Crime Killer | Vietnam Soldiers | |
| 1988 | Police Story 2 | Detective Ka Kui Chan | 1999 English version, voice (uncredited) |
| 1989 | The Iron Triangle | Pham | |
| 1990 | The Hunt for Red October | Seaman - Red October #4 | |
| 1991 | Point Break | Dispatcher | |
| 1991 | The Doctor | Jay-Jay | |
| 1991 | Mystery Date | Vince | |
| 1991–1993 | Seinfeld | Ping | 4 episodes (1 uncredited) |
| 1995 | Under Siege 2: Dark Territory | SYSOS Officer | |
| 1995 | Thunderbolt | Chan Foh To | 2000 English version, voice (uncredited) |
| 1996 | First Strike | Jackson Tsui | English version, voice |
| 1997 | Most Wanted | Patrolman | |
| 1998 | Six Days, Seven Nights | Infirmary Orderly | |
| 2000–2006 | As Told By Ginger | Archie Chang (voice) | 4 episodes |
| 2001 | Pearl Harbor | Japanese Officer | |
| 2001 | Shaolin Soccer | Bulldog | Voice |
| 2001 | Bubble Boy | Emcee | |
| 2003 | 7 Songs | King of the Road | |
| 2003 | Vampires Anonymous | Andy | |
| 2005 | Wheelmen | Mr. Young | |
| 2008 | The Sarah Silverman Program | Borjijin | Episode: "The Mongolian Beef" |
| 2009 | I Love You, Man | Mr. Chu | |
| 2011 | Love on a Leash | Kyle | |
| 2012 | California Solo | Judge | |
| 2013 | Wrong Cops | Chinese | |
| 2014 | Horrible Bosses 2 | Lobby Receptionist | |
| 2015–2018 | Silicon Valley | Henry | |
| 2021 | Bad Detectives | Detective Wong | |
| 2021 | Words Bubble Up Like Soda Pop | Mr. Fujiyama | English version, voice |
| 2021 | The Cleaner | Pharmacist | |
| 2024 | Secret Level | MC (old) | Voice, episode: "Sifu: It Takes a Life" |
