= William Martin Gelbart =

American geneticist

- Born: September 11, 1945
- Died: August 11, 2015 (aged 69)
- Education: Brooklyn College; University of Wisconsin–Madison
- Awards: George W. Beadle Award (2010)
- Scientific career
- Fields: Genetics
- Institutions: Harvard University

William Martin Gelbart (September 11, 1945 – August 11, 2015) was an American geneticist and a professor of molecular and cellular biology at Harvard University. He was best known for his work with fly genetics, the discovery of decapentaplegic (dpp), and the formation of FlyBase. He was a member of the National Advisory Council for the Human Genome Project.

== Early life and education ==
Gelbart was born in Brooklyn, New York. He earned his B.S. in biology from Brooklyn College in 1966 after attending Harpur College at Binghamton University from 1962 to 1963. He received a PhD in genetics from the University of Wisconsin–Madison in 1971 with Allen S. Fox.

== Career and research ==
Gelbart did his postdoctoral work with Edward B. Lewis at Caltech and Art Chovnick at the University of Connecticut. He began his career at Harvard University in 1976 before becoming a full professor in 1983. His research was focused on molecular basis of pattern formation using the fruit fly as a model system. Using transvection, his group identified decapentaplegic, an locus containing an ortholog of human bone morphogenetic proteins. Gelbart was a major leader in consolidating the findings of the Drosophila community into FlyBase along with Michael Ashburner, Rachel Drysdale, Gerry Rubin, Thom Kaufman and Kathy Matthews.
