= Complementation (genetics) =

Genetic process

Complementation is the capacity of a segment of genetic material, such as DNA, to restore the normal phenotype associated with a mutation by supplying functional gene activity. Complementation tests are widely used to determine whether mutations affect the same gene or different genes.

== Complementation tests ==
A simple complementation test involves mating or crossing strains of an organism that carry homozygous recessive mutations. If the mutations affect different genes, each parental genome ordinarily supplies a wild-type allele of the gene mutated in the other strain. The offspring are heterozygous at both genes and display the wild-type phenotype, a result known as intergenic complementation.

If the mutations affect the same gene, neither parental genome supplies a wild-type allele, and the offspring generally display a mutant phenotype. A phenotype weaker than that of either parent may indicate partial restoration of gene function rather than complete complementation. Simple complementation tests therefore provide a practical means of assigning mutations to genes without requiring molecular information, although exceptions occur.

Complementation can also be achieved without mating or crossing. For example, DNA introduced into a cell using molecular biology techniques may supply a functional copy of a mutated gene and restore the wild-type phenotype.

=== Examples ===
Example of a complementation test. Two strains of flies are white-eyed because of two different autosomal recessive mutations that interrupt different steps in a single pigment-producing metabolic pathway. Flies from Strain 1 have complementary mutations to flies from Strain 2 because when they are crossed the offspring can complete the full metabolic pathway and thus have red eyes.

For a simple example of a complementation test, suppose a geneticist is interested in studying two strains of white-eyed flies of the species Drosophila melanogaster, more commonly known as the common fruit fly. In this species, wild-type flies have red eyes, and eye color is known to be related to two genes, A and B. Each of these genes has two alleles, a dominant one that codes for a working protein (A and B respectively) and a recessive one that codes for a malfunctioning protein (a and b respectively). Since both proteins are necessary for the synthesis of red pigmentation in the eyes, if a given fly is homozygous for either a or b, it will have white eyes.

Knowing this, the geneticist may perform a complementation test on two separately obtained strains of pure-breeding white-eyed flies. The test is performed by crossing two flies, one from each strain. If the resulting progeny have red eyes, the two strains are said to complement; if the progeny have white eyes, they do not.

If the strains complement, we imagine that one strain must have a genotype aa BB and the other AA bb, which yields the genotype AaBb when crossed. In other words, each strain is homozygous for a different deficiency that produces the same phenotype. If the strains do not complement, they both must have genotypes 'aaBB', 'AAbb', or 'aabb'. In other words, they are both homozygous for the same deficiency, which obviously will produce the same phenotype.

=== In fungi and bacteriophage ===
Complementation tests can also be carried out with haploid eukaryotes such as fungi, with bacteria, and with viruses such as bacteriophage. Research on the fungus Neurospora crassa led to the development of the one-gene-one-enzyme concept that provided the foundation for the subsequent development of molecular genetics. The complementation test was one of the main tools used in the early Neurospora work, because it was easy to do, and allowed the investigator to determine whether any two nutritional mutants were defective in the same or different genes.

The complementation test was also used in the early development of molecular genetics when bacteriophage T4 was one of the main objects of study. In this case the test depends on mixed infections of host bacterial cells with two different bacteriophage mutant types. Its use was key to defining most of the genes of the virus, and provided the foundation for the study of such fundamental processes as DNA replication and repair, and how molecular machines are constructed.

=== Quantitative ===
Used by quantitative genetics to uncover recessive mutants. Here one takes deficiencies and crosses them to a haplotype that is believed to contain the recessive mutant.

=== Cis–trans ===
A cis–trans test compares the phenotypes of organisms carrying two mutations on the same chromosome (in cis) with those carrying the mutations on opposite members of a homologous chromosome pair (in trans). These tests can help determine whether mutations are allelic, including combinations involving dominant mutations that cannot always be interpreted using simple complementation tests.

When the mutations affect different genes, both arrangements contain one mutant and one wild-type copy of each gene, so the same phenotype is generally expected. When both mutations affect the same gene, the cis arrangement contains one wild-type copy and one doubly mutated copy, whereas the trans arrangement contains no wild-type copy. The phenotypes may therefore differ. Comparing the two arrangements can help distinguish allelism from non-allelic non-complementation.

Cis–trans tests also have exceptions. For example, the cis and trans combinations of the Drosophila mutations Cbx^{1} and pbx^{1} produce the same phenotype, although both are alleles of the Ultrabithorax gene. The molecular basis of this anomalous behavior was explained by Bender and colleagues.

== Types ==
=== Intragenic ===
When complementation between two mutants defective in the same gene is measured, it is generally found that there is either no complementation or the complementation phenotype is intermediate between the mutant and wild-type phenotypes. Intragenic complementation (also called inter-allelic complementation) has been demonstrated in many different genes in a variety of organisms including the fungi Neurospora crassa, Saccharomyces cerevisiae, and Schizosaccharomyces pombe; the bacterium Salmonella typhimurium; and the virus bacteriophage T4. In several such studies, numerous mutations defective in the same gene were isolated and mapped in a linear order based on recombination frequencies to form a genetic map of the gene. Separately, the mutants were tested in pairwise combinations to measure complementation. An analysis of the results from such studies led to the conclusion that intragenic complementation, in general, arises from the interaction of differently defective polypeptide monomers to form an aggregate called a “multimer.” Genes that encode multimer-forming polypeptides appear to be common. One interpretation of the data is that polypeptide monomers are often aligned in the multimer in such a way that mutant polypeptides defective at nearby sites in the genetic map tend to form a mixed multimer that functions poorly, whereas mutant polypeptides defective at distant sites tend to form a mixed multimer that functions more effectively. The intermolecular forces likely responsible for self-recognition and multimer formation were discussed by Jehle.

=== Heterosis ===
Heterosis is the tendency for hybrid individuals to exceed their purebred parents in size and vigor. The phenomenon has long been known in animals and plants. Heterosis appears to be largely due to genetic complementation, that is the masking of deleterious recessive alleles in hybrid individuals.

In general, the two fundamental aspects of sexual reproduction in eukaryotes are meiosis and outcrossing. These two aspects have been proposed to have two natural selective advantages, respectively. Meiosis is proposed to be adaptive because it facilitates recombinational repair of DNA damages that are otherwise difficult to repair. Outcrossing is proposed to be adaptive because it facilitates complementation, that is the masking of deleterious recessive alleles (also see heterosis). The benefit of masking deleterious alleles has been proposed to be a major factor in the maintenance of sexual reproduction among eukaryotes. Further, the selective advantage of complementation that arises from outcrossing may largely account for the general avoidance of inbreeding in nature (e.g. see articles kin recognition, inbreeding depression, and incest taboo).

== Exceptions ==
These rules (patterns) are not without exceptions. Non-allelic mutants may occasionally fail to complement (this is known as "non-allelic non-complementation" or "unlinked non-complementation"). This is an uncommon occurrence that depends on the type of mutants being investigated. Two mutations, for example, could be synthetically dominant negative. Transvection is another instance, in which a heterozygous combination of two alleles with mutations in distinct sections of the gene complement one other to restore a wild-type phenotype.

In intragenic complementation, mutations affecting the same gene nevertheless complement one another. This can occur when the mutations impair different functions of a multifunctional gene product.

Conversely, non-allelic non-complementation occurs when mutations in different genes fail to complement, for example because their products interact or have interdependent functions. A cis–trans test can help distinguish this phenomenon from mutations affecting the same gene.

== History ==
The American geneticist E. B. Lewis may have been the first to compare the phenotypes of mutations in cis and in trans, using the fruit fly Drosophila. The modern use of complementation to assign mutations to genes owes much to Seymour Benzer's work with bacteriophage.

== See also ==
- Blue-white screen
