= Nelson Ikon Wu =

American novelist

- Born: Nelson Ikon Wu; 9 June 1919; Peking, China
- Died: 19 March 2002 (aged 82); Brookline, Massachusetts, United States
- Occupations: Novelist, professor
- Writing career
- Pen name: Lu Chiao or Qiao Lu
- Language: English, Chinese
- Genres: Non-fiction, fictional prose
- Notable awards: Guggenheim Fellowship, Fulbright Scholarship; 1965

Nelson Ikon Wu
- Traditional Chinese: 吳訥孫
- Simplified Chinese: 吴讷孙
Transcriptions
Standard Mandarin
- Hanyu Pinyin: Wú Nèsūn

Nelson Ikon Wu (9 June 1919 – 19 Mar 2002) was a Chinese and American writer and professor of Asian art history.

== Biography ==
Nelson Ikon Wu was born in Peking, China into a family of Minhou, Fuzhou origin. Wu earned a bachelor's degree from National Southwestern Associated University in Kunming in 1942 and came to the United States in 1945. He attended The New School for Social Research before earning a master's degree in 1949 and doctorate in 1954 in art history from Yale University.

Wu was a scholar of Asian art and architecture. He was the Edward Mallinckrodt Distinguished University Professor Emeritus of the History of Art and Chinese Culture in Arts & Sciences. He came to Washington University in St. Louis in 1965, becoming a key figure for the promotion of Asian art in St. Louis and, in 1971, a founder of the Asian Art Society. He was named professor emeritus in 1984. Wu was a best-selling author in Mainland China and Taiwan, occasionally using his pen name Lu Ch'iao (literally, Deer Bridge). In 1958 he published his first novel "Song Never to End" or "Never-ending Saga" (Wei yang ko or Weiyang ge), which focused on friendships among four young people during the Second Sino-Japanese War. It has sold more than one million copies and in 1991 was voted most influential book of the 1950s by readers of the China Times, Taiwan's largest daily newspaper and ranked number 73 for 20th century Chinese novels. "Nelson was an extremely charismatic figure with a large following on campus and in St. Louis," said Mark S. Weil, Ph.D., the E. Desmond Lee Professor for Collaboration in the Arts and director the Gallery of Art. "Every year around Christmas, he would give a lecture celebrating Pan-Asian spirituality that filled Steinberg Auditorium."

While at Yale, Wu met Mu-lien Hsueh, a Wellesley College graduate also born in Beijing. The couple married in 1951. Biologist Ting Wu and actor Ping Wu are their children.

Wu taught at Yale, San Francisco State University, and Kyoto University in Japan and Washington University in St. Louis. His honors include a Guggenheim Fellowship and a Fulbright Research Scholarship.

== Works ==
=== English ===
- Chinese and Indian Architecture: The City of Man, the Mountain of God, and the Realm of the Immortals
- The Chinese pictorial art : its format and program : some universalities, particularities and modern experimentations
- The intellectual aristocrat and justice in art: A cautionary story for the West about those Chinese masters who became their own patrons and, over the centuries, their own heroes
- Tung Ch'i-ch'ang, 1555-1636: Apathy in government and fervor in art
- Tung Ch'i-ch'ang : the man, his time, and his landscape painting (1954 PhD thesis Yale Univ.)
- Intellectual Movements Since the Teachings of Wang Yang-ming: Parallel but Nonconcurrent Developments, 1973
- The Juggler (a short story) "Little Little Boy put up his hands with all his little fingers outstretched. One by one, fireflies came out from the all grass and alighted on his fingers, one firefly to each finger, not one more, not one less. With his hand and face alight from the glow of ten fireflies, Little Little Boy looked magnificent." This was also published as an illustrated children's book.

=== Chinese ===
Dr. Wu has four major books in Chinese:

- "Never-ending Saga" (Wei yang ko, 未央歌 ) 1947 ISBN 957-05-1157-5
- "Son of Man" (Ren Zi，人子) 1993
- "Affections and Regrets" (Chan qing shu，忏情书) 1975
- "City chan home" (Shi chan ju, 市尘居) 1998 ISBN 957-13-2779-4.

== Legacy ==
Wu died Tuesday, March 19, 2002, of cancer at the Beth Israel Deaconess Medical Center in Boston, Massachusetts. In that year, the Washington University East Asian Library established the Nelson I. Wu Memorial Book Fund. In 1998, Washington University and the Saint Louis Art Museum inaugurated the annual Nelson I. Wu Lecture on Asian Art and Culture. Lecturers have included (in order from 1998 to 2012) Richard Barnhart, Milo Beach, Nicole Coolidge Rousamaniere, Robert Mowry, Maxwell Hearn, Lothar von Falkenhausen, Timothy Clark, Lu Jie, Nancy Steinhardt, Jerome Silbergeld, and Andrew Watsky, Yukio Lippit, Jane Portal, Colin C. Mackenzie, and Vidya Dehejia. His home and bamboo grove in St. Louis which contains Nelson Wu's calligraphy of the Book of Changes (I Ching) handwritten covering the four walls of an entire room has been preserved.

The Washington University Libraries maintain Nelson Wu’s collection on East Asian art, architecture, and Chinese culture.

An album, title song and music video in 2013 are focused on his 1945 book, "Never-Ending Saga".
