= Shadow enhancer =

Shadow enhancers are groups of DNA regulatory sequences that function alongside primary enhancers to regulate gene expression. Originally discovered in Drosophila, shadow enhancers have since been identified in a wide range of organisms, including insects, plants, and mammals. Shadow enhancers work alongside primary enhancers to drive overlapping gene expression patterns, which stabilizes gene expression against genetic and environmental fluctuations. Shadow enhancers can act at a large genomic range, are highly evolutionarily conserved and interact with many molecules to drive gene expression patterns. Shadow enhancers play a crucial role in development and early embryogenesis by maintaining stable expression of a variety of genes.

== Discovery ==
Shadow enhancers were first described in 2008 by Michael Levine and his research group at the University of California, Berkeley. Their research in Drosophila investigated the transcription factor Dorsal and its target genes. Through characterization of enhancers using ChIP-chip assays, they found that some enhancers appeared to produce gene expression patterns that overlap with those produced by the primary enhancer. Initially, shadow enhancers were believed to act redundantly to the function of the primary enhancer to ensure proper gene expression, despite environmental or genetic variability.

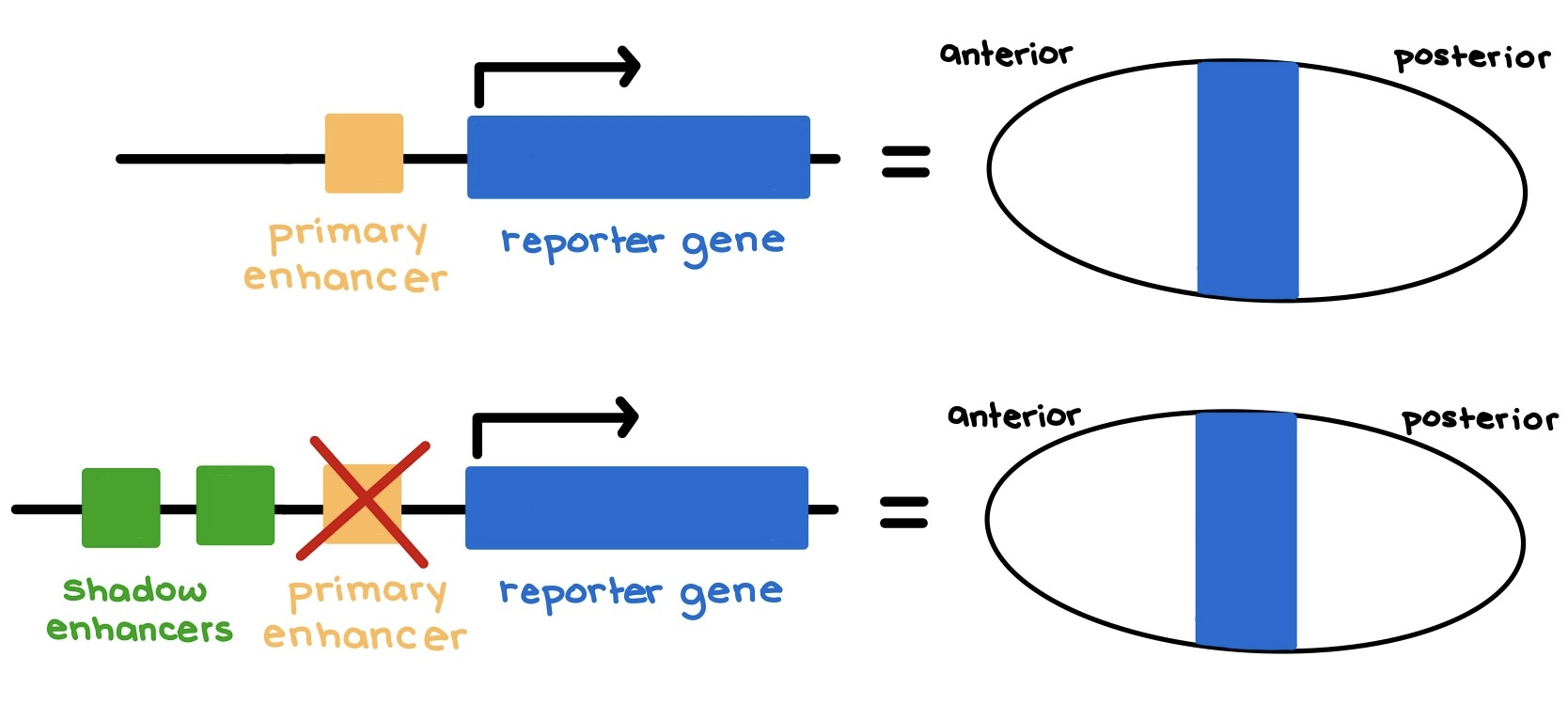
How shadow enhancers modulate overlapping expression patterns with the primary enhancer, ensuring proper developmental patterning. Shadow enhancers act as a layer of redundancy to ensure that any mutation to the primary enhancer does not affect development of an organism.

== Function ==
Shadow enhancers are regulatory DNA elements that play a critical role in stabilizing gene expression and minimizing variability. They work alongside primary enhancers to ensure consistent transcriptional activity, even under fluctuating environmental conditions or genetic disturbances. One of their primary functions is to provide a backup mechanism for gene regulation; if a primary enhancer is mutated or damaged, shadow enhancers can compensate and maintain proper gene expression patterns. Therefore, genes that are regulated by these redundant enhancer regions are more resistant to mutations within their non-coding regions.

Shadow enhancers, like any enhancer, do not directly interact with the promoter of a gene to regulate gene expression. Shadow enhancers instead directly bind transcription factors, which can then interact with the promoter. Different shadow enhancers can interact with many different transcription factors in order to indirectly interact and affect the promoter of a gene. Shadow enhancers are a part of a multi-enhancer complex, therefore they can compete with one another to influence a single promoter. In contrast, multiple shadow enhancers can also have an additive effect on a single promoter, therefore boosting its intensity or activity. As well, shadow enhancers can work on multiple non-connected promoters in order to influence development at its different stages.

=== Redundancy ===
A key characteristic of shadow enhancers is their functional redundancy, which arises from their ability to functionally overlap with primary enhancers in controlling gene expression. This redundancy enhances the strength of gene regulation by ensuring that multiple enhancers contribute to the expression of a single gene. If a gene is regulated not only by a primary enhancer but also by two or more shadow enhancers, then the gene has additional protection against the failure of a single regulatory element. In contrast, genes regulated solely by a primary enhancer lack this redundancy, making them more vulnerable to regulatory disruptions. Shadow enhancers exhibit varying levels of redundancy across different contexts and timeframes. Some shadow enhancers' redundant function can be restricted to a small timeframe or a small number of cells, while others can have a more extensive overlap and thus are more functionally redundant.

=== Non-redundancy ===
While shadow enhancers' primary function is to drive overlapping gene expression patterns in order to fine-tune gene expression patterns, some shadow enhancers also play important non-redundant roles. Shadow enhancers may be redundant in one developmental stage or tissue type and non-redundant in another, indicating they can have their own essential functions. Some shadow enhancers are redundant under normal conditions but non-redundant under extreme conditions, highlighting their importance in stabilizing gene expression in unfavourable conditions.

== Characteristics ==
=== Location ===
Shadow enhancers can be positioned at various distances from their target genes, often farther away compared to primary enhancers. Shadow enhancers are cis-acting regulatory elements, thus they are located on the same DNA molecule as the gene they regulate. They may reside within intronic regions or beyond adjacent genes, exerting their regulatory influence over a broad genomic range. Although both shadow and primary enhancers contribute to gene expression, shadow enhancers tend to operate from more distal genomic locations.

=== Evolutionary Conservation ===
Shadow enhancers are evolutionary conserved sequences that are present in a wide range of organisms, including both vertebrate and invertebrate species. Shadow enhancers have been shown to be more conserved than non-redundant enhancers, which suggests their function is crucial not only in the development of an organism but also throughout evolutionary time. Genes important in development have complex and highly conserved regulation, which explains why shadow enhancers that regulate these genes are highly conserved. Shadow enhancers' partial redundancy also explains why they are maintained over evolutionary time, as they serve important redundant and non-redundant functions that contributes to the proper development of organisms. The conservation of shadow enhancers across taxonomic groups showcases just how important shadow enhancers are in the viability of organisms.

=== Functional sites ===
Shadow enhancers must interact with many factors in order to regulate and reduce variability in gene expression. Shadow enhancers contain clustered binding sites, and the binding of a transcription factor to these sites can either activate or repress gene expression. Shadow enhancers have a higher proportion of functional sites than non-redundant enhancers, suggesting they are involved in complex regulation of gene expression.

== Role in development ==
Shadow enhancers play a critical role in embryogenesis, particularly in defining body patterning. By modulating transcriptional activation strength, timing, and location, they ensure precise control of gene expression during development. Their ability to fine-tune gene expression levels helps maintain stability, allowing organisms to grow and develop properly despite environmental stresses. Shadow enhancers can compensate for mutations in primary enhancers, acting as a buffer against genetic and environmental fluctuations. This buffering capacity ensures consistent and precise gene expression patterns, which are crucial for proper body development and overall developmental stability. Mutations to shadow enhancers confer a higher fitness consequence than mutations to non-redundant enhancers, highlighting their importance in proper development and thus viability of organisms. Shadow enhancers are important in the regulation of many genes involved in development and have been well characterized in Drosophila.

=== Twin of eyeless regulation in Drosophila ===
Shadow enhancers are important in the regulation of the twin of eyeless (toy) gene in Drosophila. The toy gene is crucial for eye development, therefore these shadow enhancers work together to drive toy expression during early embryogenesis. Their overlapping yet distinct expression patterns ensures consistent toy expression during critical developmental processes.

=== snail regulation in Drosophila ===
Shadow enhancers play a crucial role in regulation of the snail gene during Drosophila embryogenesis. The snail gene encodes a transcription factor that is essential for epithelial-mesenchymal transitions in many developmental processes. Shadow enhancers maintain snail expression under environmental and genetic disturbances in order to ensure proper gastrulation.

=== Krüppel regulation in Drosophila ===
Shadow enhancers are important in the regulation of the Krüppel (Kr) gene in Drosophila. The Krüppel gene is involved in early segmentation and creates precise patterning along the anterior-posterior axis of the Drosophila embryo. Shadow enhancers are crucial in facilitating Kr expression, ultimately ensuring accurate spacial and temporal expression of Krüppel. Shadow enhancers are important in fine-tuning gene expression patterns during critical developmental stages.

=== Sonic hedgehog regulation in mice ===
Two shadow enhancers have been identified to be involved in the regulation of the sonic hedgehog (SHH) gene in mice. In vertebrates, SHH is important in forming the ventral midline of the central nervous system. Without shadow enhancers to ensure proper expression of Shh, the brain can become malformed. Therefore, shadow enhancers are crucial in ensuring proper development and stabilizing gene expression of important developmental genes, like SHH.
