= Quan shanggu Sandai Qin Han Sanguo Liuchao wen =

Chinese collection of pre-Tang literature

Quan shanggu Sandai Qin Han Sanguo Liuchao wen

Quan shanggu Sandai Qin Han Sanguo Liuchao wen (simplified Chinese: 全上古三代秦汉三国六朝文; traditional Chinese: 全上古三代秦漢三國六朝文; Wade–Giles: Ch'üan shang-ku San-tai Ch'in Han San-kuo Liu-ch'ao wên; "Complete prose of high antiquity, the Three Dynasties, Qin, Han, Three Kingdoms, and Six Dynasties") is a monumental collection of texts from the period before the Tang dynasty, compiled by Yan Kejun (严可均) (1762–1843) during the Qing dynasty. It was only published after Yan's death, and in several editions. The manuscript passed successively through the hands of Jiang He 蒋壑, Fang Gonghui 方功惠, Wang Bingen 王秉恩, Ding Fubao 丁福保, Ye Jingkui 叶景葵, and others; the Ye family (叶氏) donated it to the United Library (合众图书馆) (in Shanghai).

== Introduction ==
The collectaneum consists of 15 collections (ji 集), each of the collections can thus be regarded as a book of its own. It contains works from the "Three Dynasties" (Sandai, i.e., Xia, Shang, and Zhou, 11th cent.–221 BCE), the Qin (221–206 BCE), Former Han (206 BCE–8 CE, including the reign of Wang Mang), Later Han (25–220 CE), Three Kingdoms (220–280 CE), Jin (265–420), (Liu)-Song (420–479), (Southern) Qi (479–502), Liang (502–557), Chen (557–589), Later (i.e., Northern) Wei (386–534), Northern Qi (550–577), Later (i.e., Northern) Zhou (557–581), Sui (581–618), and pre-dynastic Tang (Xian-Tang). In total, more than 3,400 authors are represented, each with a short biography describing origins, offices, titles, and major life events.

The collection is particularly valuable because it brings together texts from a wide variety of sources, including official edicts, letters, proposals, inscriptions, poems, and admonitions. Many texts from the Later Han and Three Kingdoms period were fragmentary and were reconstructed from multiple sources, while texts from later dynasties are mostly preserved intact. The works are arranged chronologically and by category, facilitating scholarly study of the literature, history, religion, and language of ancient China.

To this day, this collection is the most comprehensive compilation of Chinese prose literature before the Tang dynasty and represents an indispensable source for historians, literary scholars, and philologists. It is used both for research on individual authors and for the analysis of literary and historical developments in early China.

In the Guangxu era, Wang Yuzhao 王毓藻 had it printed from the manuscript by the Guangya Publishing House 广雅书局 (the “Cantonese edition” 粤刻本), though without punctuation. In 1930, the Medical Publishing House 医学书局 issued an edition with punctuation based on the manuscript and corrected more than 1,000 errors and omissions.

The Hanyu Da Zidian (HYDZD), for example, refers to the 1980 edition published by Zhonghua shuju.

== Volumes ==
The collectaneum, arranged according to dynasties, consists of 15 collections (ji 集) of varying length, in which a differing number of persons are treated:

- Quan shanggu Sandai wen 全上古三代文 16 juan – High antiquity and Three Dynasties (Xia, Shang, Zhou) – 206 persons
- Quan Qinwen 全秦文 1 juan – Qin – 26
- Quan Hanwen 全汉文 63 juan – (Former) Han – 334
- Quan Hou Hanwen 全后汉文 106 juan – (Later) Han – 470
- Quan Sanguowen 全三国文 75 juan – Three Kingdoms – 294
- Quan Jinwen 全晋文 167 juan – Jin – 830
- Quan Songwen 全宋文 64 juan – (Liu)-Song – 278
- Quan Qiwen 全齐文 26 juan – (Southern) Qi – 131
- Quan Liangwen 全梁文 74 juan – Liang – 204
- Quan Chenwen 全陈文 18 juan – Chen – 63
- Quan Hou Weiwen 全后魏文 60 juan – Later (i.e., Northern) Wei – 302
- Quan Bei Qiwen 全北齐文 10 juan – Northern Qi – 84
- Quan Hou Zhouwen 全后周文 24 juan – Later (i.e., Northern) Zhou – 61
- Quan Suiwen 全隋文 36 juan – Sui – 168
- Xian Tangwen 先唐文 1 juan – pre-dynastic Tang – 54

== Modern edition ==
- （Qing）Yan Kejun: 全上古三代秦汉三国六朝文（全四册）. Zhonghua shuju 2000, ISBN 9787101008685

== Bibliography ==
- Hanyu da zidian. 1993 (one-volume edition)
- David Knechtges: "Quan shanggu Sandai Qin Han Sanguo Liuchao wen." In Early Medieval Chinese Texts: A Bibliographical Guide, edited by Cynthia L. Chennault, et al., 242–244. Berkeley: Institute of East Asian Studies, University of California, Berkeley 2015
- Ancient and Early Medieval Chinese Literature: A Reference Guide, Part 1, 2010 (in partial view)
- Harvard-Yenching Institute Sinological Index Series & Supplement 8: 全上古三代秦漢三國六朝文作者引得 Index to the Authors in Ch'uan Shang Ku San Tai Ch'in Han San Kuo Liu Ch'ao Wen (cf. chengwen.com)
