= Commercial Press (Taiwan) =

Publishing and retailer (est. 1950)

The Commercial Press, Ltd.
- Company type: Limited by Shares
- Traded as: Unlisted
- Industry: Publishing
- Founded: October 10, 1950 (Company registration date)
- Headquarters: Republic of China 5F, No. 108-3, Minquan Road, Xindian District, New Taipei City
- Key people: Wang Chunshen (Chairman)
- Products: books
- Website: www.cptw.com.tw

The Commercial Press (Taiwan) or Taiwan Commercial Press, (Chinese: 臺灣商務印書館), officially "the Commercial Press, Ltd.", is a publishing and retail company in Taipei. Its predecessor was the "Commercial Press Taiwan Branch" established in October 1947. During the fifteen years when Wang Yunwu was Chairman of the company, the Commercial Press enjoyed a golden age when it published nearly a thousand books annually.

== History ==
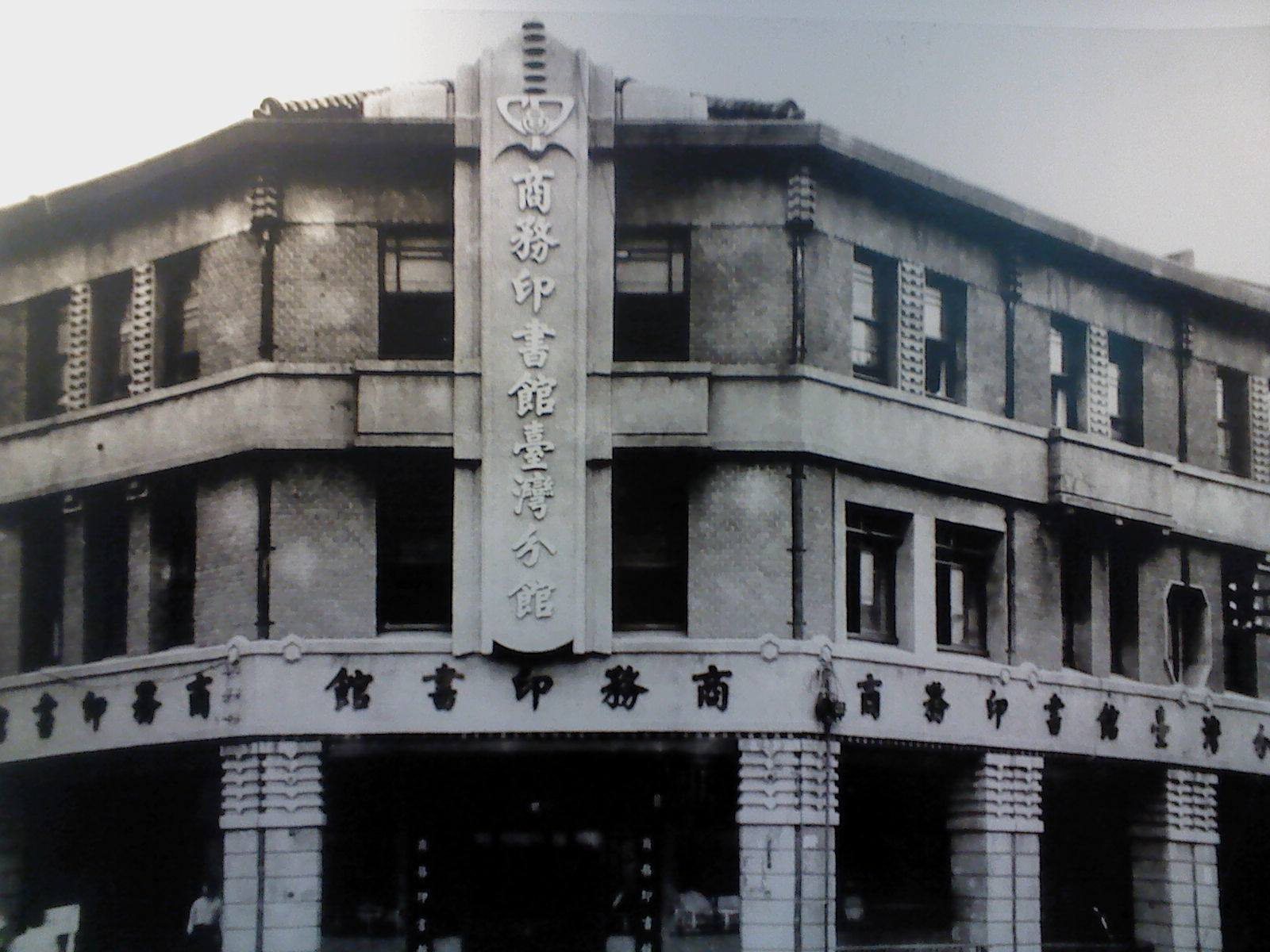
The Commercial Press Taiwan Branch before renovation

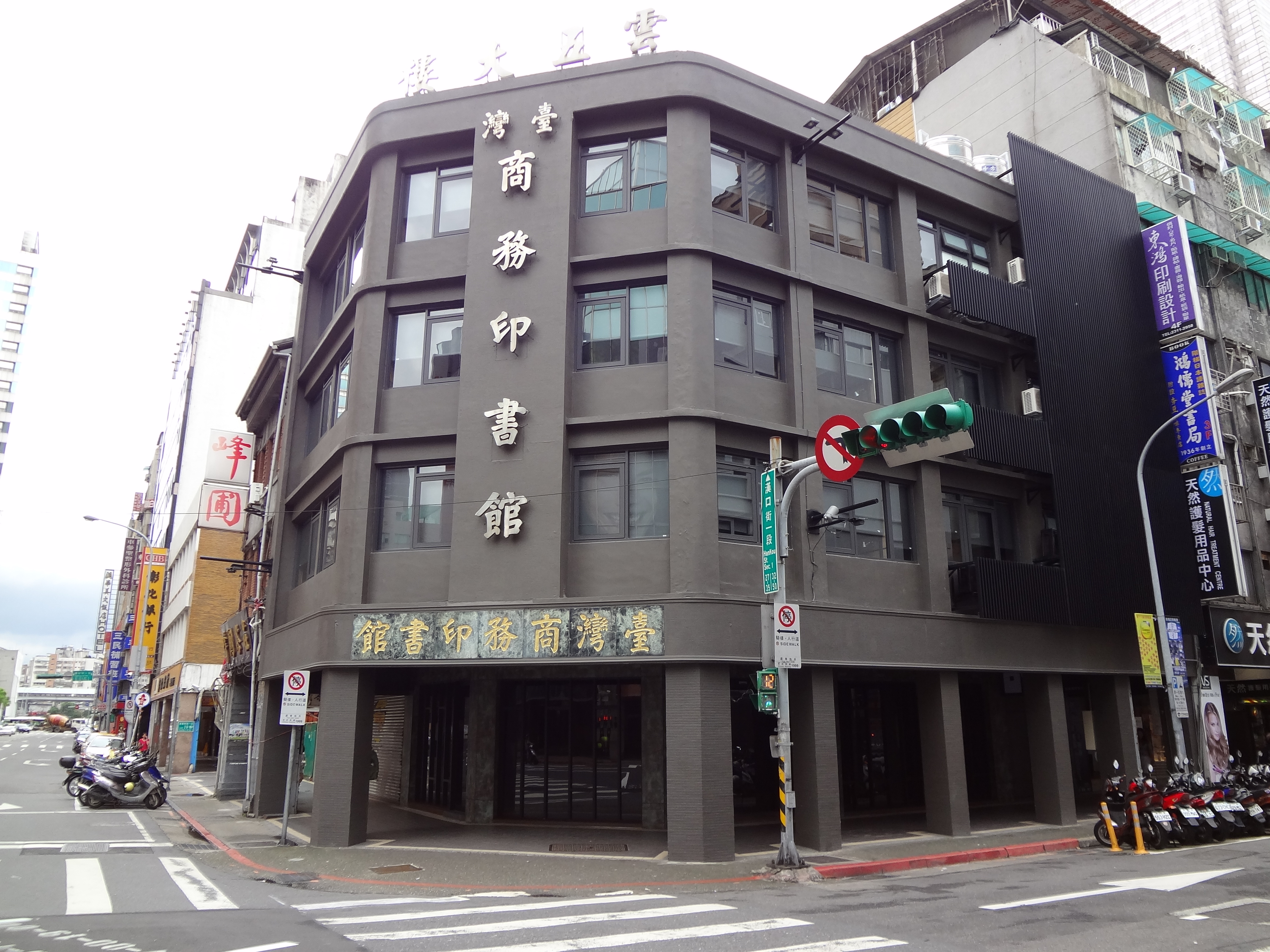
Yunwu Building

In September 1947, the Commercial Press dispatched Ye Youmei, manager of its Fuzhou branch, to Taiwan to plan the establishment of a branch. In October 1947, the Commercial Press purchased a three-story brick and wood building at No. 37, Section 1, Chongqing South Road, Chengzhong District, Taipei City, and renovated it as the site for its Taiwan branch.

In early 1948, the "Commercial Press Taiwan Branch" opened, selling books, stationery, and other items shipped from the Commercial Press's headquarters in Shanghai. However, the volume and variety of books were limited, and the branch did not have its own publishing business.

In 1949, with the founding of the People's Republic of China, the Commercial Press (Shanghai) immediately ceased shipping to its Taiwan branch. Faced with a shortage of books to sell, Zhao Shucheng, manager of the Commercial Press's Taiwan branch, decided to expand into editing and printing, transforming from a sales outlet into an independent publishing house. At the request of the Chiang Kai-shek government, the Commercial Press's Taiwan branch separated from the main branch and changed its name to "The Commercial Press, Taiwan." To this day, neither the English name nor the headquarters address has changed. On October 10, 1950, the Commercial Press, Taiwan, completed company registration. The Commercial Press began by compiling textbooks. For the first decade or so in Taiwan, under the direction of Zhao Shucheng, the focus was on reprinting publications and textbooks from the mainland era.

In 1964, Wang Yunwu, former general manager of the Commercial Press, became chairman of the Commercial Press, Taiwan, and established a new publishing blueprint, emphasizing the publication of large-scale ancient book series, reprints, and the "Everyone's Library," a collection of new and old books. The printing of ancient books was free of copyright restrictions, which could save a lot of costs. It also echoed the Chinese cultural revival movement and became the mainstream of publishing at that time.

In 1967, the company published "Wei Yang Ge", a novel on the student life at Southwest Associated University. It soon became popular on university campuses in the 1960s and 1970s, achieving a sales record of 500,000 copies and 50 printings.

In 1968, the headquarters of the Commercial Press in Taiwan was rebuilt into a four-story reinforced concrete building, called the "Yunwu Building".

On August 14, 1979, Wang Yunwu died of illness in Taipei City at the age of 92. From 1964, when Wang Yunwu resigned as Vice Premier of the Executive Yuan, to the fifteenth year before his death, the Commercial Press enjoyed a golden age when it published nearly a thousand books each year.

In 1979, Liu Fake became the chairman of the Commercial Press in Taiwan and led its transformation. In 1986, the Commercial Press in Taiwan published the Wenyuange Sikuquanshu, a massive series encompassing 3,460 titles, 36,575 volumes, and 2,400,000 pages, in 1,500 hardcover volumes. The volume has been a success both domestically and internationally. In 2007, it received the Executive Yuan Government Information Office's "Golden Signature Time-Honored Brand" Special Award for Outstanding Publishing Enterprises.

In May 2002, Liu Fake retired and Wang Yunwu's son Wang Xuezhe, at the age of 80, became the chairman of the Commercial Press in Taiwan.

In 2011, Shi Jiaming became the chairman of the Commercial Press in Taiwan, and Wang Chunshen, the eldest grandson of Wang Yunwu, took over as the vice chairman.

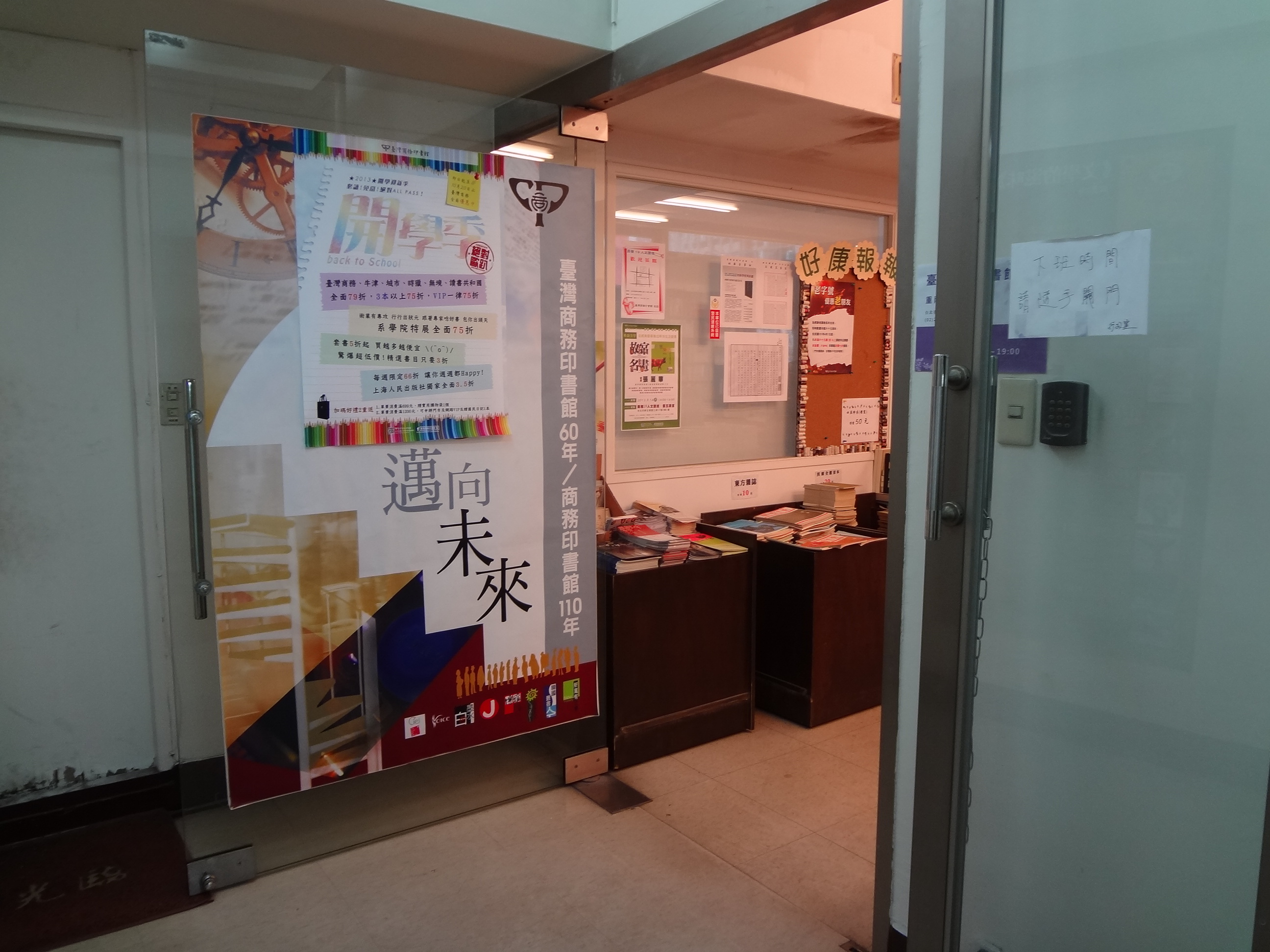
Chongnan Store

In August 2011, the electronic newspaper "Chongnan Canqi Electronic News" jointly issued by the Commercial Press in Taiwan and United Daily News Network was launched. On August 25, 2011, Fang Pengcheng, editor-in-chief of the Commercial Press, Taiwan, confirmed that the reconstruction of the Yunwu Building had been agreed upon more than two years ago. After demolition, it will be converted into a mixed-use residential and commercial building with 15 floors above ground and 4 floors underground. However, the building license application process is still in progress and the demolition time has not been determined. The cast signs of "Taiwan Commercial Press" and "Yunwu Building" removed from the exterior wall will be collected in the Wang Yunwu Memorial Hall at Lane 19, Section 3, Xinsheng South Road, Taipei City.

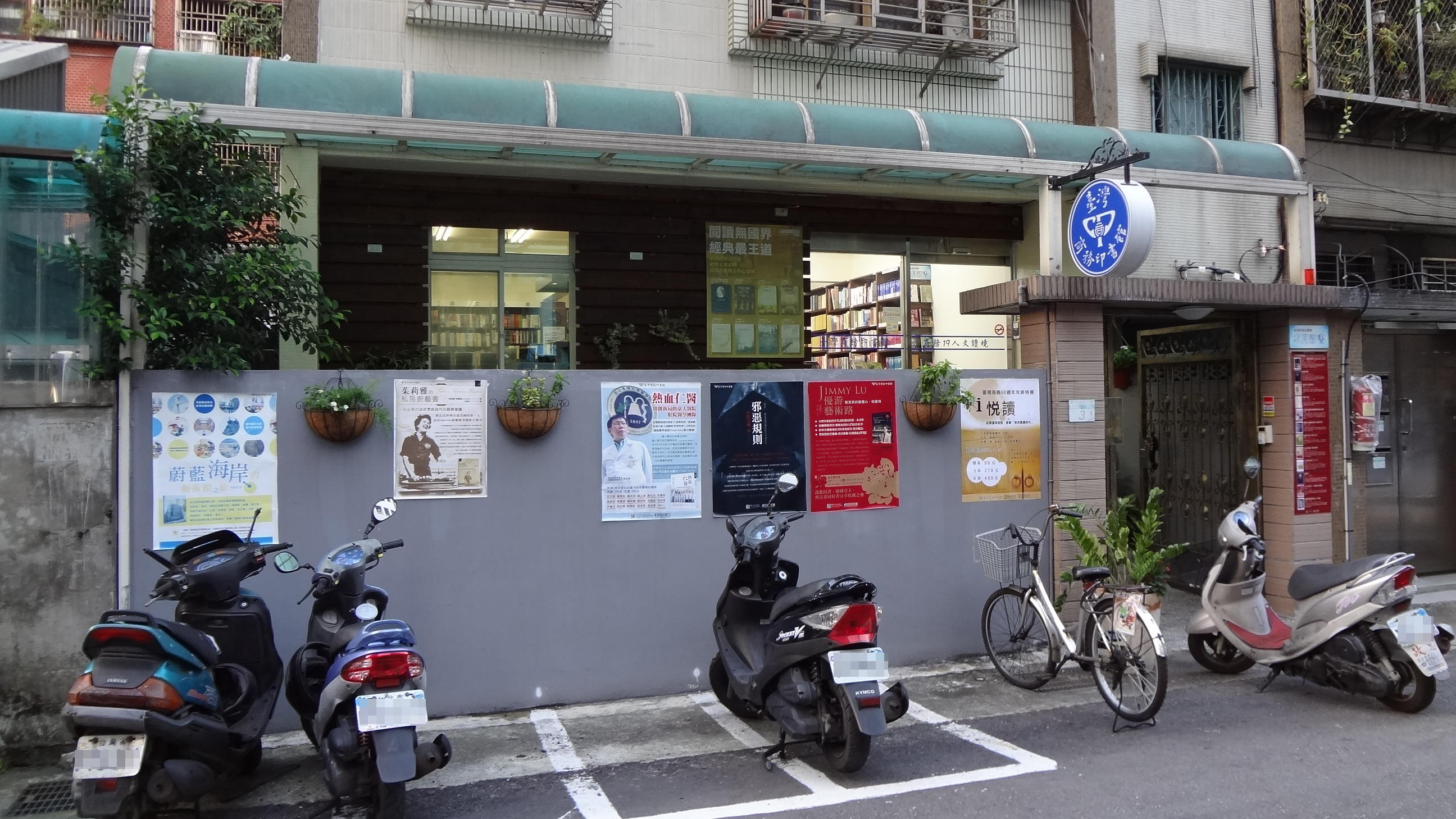
New South Branch

On March 22, 2013, the New South Branch of the Commercial Press, Taiwan, opened on the 1st floor of No. 3, Lane 19, Section 3, Xinsheng South Road, Da'an District, Taipei City. It was named "Commercial Press 19th Humanistic Reading Space" and was once Wang Yunwu's library. The Wang Yunwu Memorial Hall is diagonally opposite.

In June 2014, Wang Chunshen took over as chairman of the Commercial Press, Taiwan.

In 2017, the Commercial Press in Taiwan celebrated its 70th anniversary and won the Gold Award in the "Large Booth Category" of the 2017 Taipei International Book Fair's Best Booth Design Award.

On January 15, 2018, the Commercial Press headquarters and branch moved to the 5th Floor, No. 108-3, Minquan Road, Xindian District, New Taipei City.

== Chairmen ==
So far, there have been five chairmen of the Taiwan Commercial Press.

1. Wang Yunwu (王雲五, 1964-1979)
2. Liu Fake (劉發克, 1979-2002)
3. Wang Xuezhe (王學哲, 2002-2011)
4. Shi Jiaming (施嘉明, 2011-2014)
5. Wang Chunshen (王春申, 2014- )

== See also ==
- Commercial Press
- Wang Yunwu
- Chung Hwa Book Company (Taiwan)
