= Transvection (genetics) =

Transvection is an epigenetic phenomenon that results from an interaction between an allele on one chromosome and the corresponding allele on the homologous chromosome. Transvection can lead to either gene activation or repression. It can also occur between nonallelic regions of the genome as well as regions of the genome that are not transcribed.

The first observation of mitotic (i.e. non-meiotic) chromosome pairing was discovered via microscopy in 1908 by Nettie Stevens. Edward B. Lewis at Caltech discovered transvection at the bithorax complex in Drosophila in the 1950s. Since then, transvection has been observed at a number of additional loci in Drosophila, including the genes known as white, decapentaplegic, eyes absent, vestigial, and yellow. As defined by Lewis, "Operationally, transvection is occurring if the phenotype of a given genotype can be altered solely by disruption of somatic (or meiotic) pairing. Such disruption can generally be accomplished by introduction of a heterozygous rearrangement that disrupts pairing in the relevant region but has no position effect of its own on the phenotype" (cited by Ting Wu and Jim Morris, 1999). Recently, pairing-mediated phenomena have been observed in species other than Drosophila, including mice, humans, plants, nematodes, insects, and fungi. In light of these findings, transvection may represent a potent and widespread form of gene regulation.

Transvection appears to be dependent upon chromosome pairing. In some cases, if one allele is placed on a different chromosome by a translocation, transvection does not occur. Transvection can sometimes be restored in a translocation homozygote, where both alleles may once again be able to pair. Restoration of phenotype has been observed at bithorax, decapentaplegic, eyes absent, and vestigial, and with transgenes of white. In some cases, transvection between two alleles leads to intragenic complementation while disruption of transvection disrupts the complementation.

Transvection is believed to occur through a variety of mechanisms. In one mechanism, the enhancers of one allele activate the promoter of a paired second allele. Other mechanisms include pairing-sensitive silencing and enhancer bypass of a chromatin insulator through pairing-mediated changes in gene structure.

The physiological relevance of transvection has recently been documented in the context of sex-biased gene expression. In Drosophila, transvection acts on the female X-linked gene yellow, which is homozygous in females (XX) versus hemizygous in males (XY).

== See also ==
- Complementation (genetics)
