= List of diseases (C) =

This is a list of diseases starting with the letter "C".

== C ==
- C syndrome
- C1 esterase deficiency (angioedema)

== Ca ==
=== Cac–Cal ===
- Cacchi–Ricci disease
- CACH syndrome
- Café au lait spots syndrome
- Caffeine-induced sleep disorder
- Caffey disease
- CAHMR syndrome
- Calcinosis cutis (see also CREST syndrome)
- Calciphylaxis
- Calculi
- Calderon–Gonzalez–Cantu syndrome
- Calloso genital dysplasia
- Callus disease
- Calpainopathy
- Calvarial doughnut lesions-bone fragility syndrome
- Calvarial hyperostosis

=== Cam–Can ===
- Camera–Marugo–Cohen syndrome
- Camfak syndrome
- Campomelia Cumming type
- Camptobrachydactyly
- Camptocormia
- Camptodactyly fibrous tissue hyperplasia skeletal dysplasia
- Camptodactyly joint contractures facial skeletal dysplasia
- Camptodactyly overgrowth unusual facies
- Camptodactyly syndrome Guadalajara type 1
- Camptodactyly syndrome Guadalajara type 2
- Camptodactyly-taurinuria syndrome
- Camptodactyly vertebral fusion
- Campylobacteriosis
- Camurati–Engelmann disease
- Canavan leukodystrophy
- Candidiasis
  - Chronic mucocutaneous candidiasis
- Canga's bead symptom
- Canine distemper
- Cannabis dependence
- Cannabis withdrawal
- Cantalamessa–Baldini–Ambrosi syndrome
- Cantu–Sanchez–Corona–Fragoso syndrome
- Cantu–Sanchez–Corona–Garcia syndrome
- Cantu–Sanchez–Corona–Hernandes syndrome

=== Cap ===
- Capillary leak syndrome
- Capillary leak syndrome with monoclonal gammopathy
- Capillary venous leptomeningeal angiomatosis
- Caplan's syndrome
- CAPOS syndrome

=== Car ===
==== Cara–Carc ====
- Caratolo–Cilio–Pessagno syndrome
- Carbamoyl phosphate synthetase deficiency
- Carbamoyl phosphate synthetase I deficiency
- Carbohydrate deficient glycoprotein syndrome
- Carbon baby syndrome
- Carbonic anhydrase II deficiency
- Carcinoid syndrome
- Carcinoma of the vocal tract
- Carcinoma, squamous cell
- Carcinoma, squamous cell of head and neck
- Carcinophobia

==== Card ====
===== Cardi =====
====== Cardia ======
- Cardiac amyloidosis
- Cardiac and laterality defects
- Cardiac arrest
- Cardiac conduction defect, familial
- Cardiac diverticulum
- Cardiac hydatid cysts with intracavitary expansion
- Cardiac malformation
- Cardiac tamponade
- Cardiac valvular dysplasia, X-linked

====== Cardio ======
- Cardioauditory syndrome
- Cardioauditory syndrome of Sanchez-Cascos
- Cardiofacial syndrome short limbs
- Cardiofaciocutaneous syndrome
- Cardiogenital syndrome
- Cardiomelic syndrome Stratton Koehler type
- Cardiomyopathy:
  - Arrhythmogenic right ventricular cardiomyopathy
  - Cardiomyopathic lentiginosis
  - Cardiomyopathy cataract hip spine disease
  - Cardiomyopathy diabetes deafness
  - Dilated cardiomyopathy: Cardiomyopathy dilated with conduction defect type 1, Cardiomyopathy dilated with conduction defect type 2, Cardiomyopathy, familial dilated
  - Cardiomyopathy due to anthracyclines
  - Cardiomyopathy hearing loss type t RNA lysine gene mutation
  - Hypertrophic cardiomyopathy: familial
  - Cardiomyopathy hypogonadism metabolic anomalies
  - Cardiomyopathy spherocytosis
  - Cardiomyopathy, fatal fetal, due to myocardial calcification
  - Cardiomyopathy, X linked, fatal infantile
  - Restrictive cardiomyopathy
- Cardioskeletal myopathy-neutropenia
- Cardiospasm
- Cardiospondylocarpofacial syndrome

==== Care–Carr ====
- Caregiver syndrome
- Carey–Fineman–Ziter syndrome
- Carnevale–Canun–Mendoza syndrome
- Carnevale–Hernandez–Castillo syndrome
- Carnevale–Krajewska–Fischetto syndrome
- Carney syndrome
- Carnitine palmitoyl transferase deficiency

- Carnitine palmitoyltransferase I deficiency
- Carnitine palmitoyltransferase II deficiency

- Carnitine transporter deficiency
- Carnitine-acylcarnitine translocase deficiency
- Carnosinase deficiency
- Carnosinemia
- Caroli disease
- Carotenemia
- Carotid artery dissection
- Carpal deformity migrognathia microstomia
- Carpal tunnel syndrome
- Carpenter syndrome
- Carpenter–Hunter type
- Carpo tarsal osteolysis recessive
- Carpotarsal osteochondromatosis
- Carrington syndrome
- Carrion’s disease

==== Cart ====
- Cartilage hair hypoplasia like syndrome
- Cartilage–hair hypoplasia
- Cartilaginous neoplasms
- Cartwright–Nelson–Fryns syndrome

=== Cas ===
- Cassia–Stocco–Dos Santos syndrome
- Castleman's disease
- Castro–Gago–Pombo–Novo syndrome

=== Cat ===
- Cat-cry syndrome – see Cri du chat syndrome
- Cat-eye syndrome a.k.a. Schmid–Fraccaro syndrome
- Cat-scratch disease

==== Cata ====
- Cataract
- Cataract, congenital ichthyosis
- Cataract aberrant oral frenula growth retardation
- Cataract anterior polar dominant
- Cataract-ataxia-deafness syndrome
- Cataract cardiomyopathy
- Cataract congenital autosomal dominant
- Cataract congenital dominant non nuclear
- Cataract congenital Volkmann type
- Cataract congenital with microphthalmia
- Cataract dental syndrome
- Cataract Hutterite type
- Cataract hypertrichosis mental retardation
- Cataract mental retardation hypogonadism
- Cataract microcornea syndrome
- Cataract microphthalmia septal defect
- Cataract skeletal anomalies
- Cataract, alopecia, sclerodactyly
- Cataract, congenital, with microcornea or slight microphthalmia
- Cataract, total congenital
- Cataract-glaucoma

==== Catc–Cate ====
- CATCH 22 syndrome
- Catecholamine hypertension
- Catel–Manzke syndrome

=== Cau–Cay ===
- Caudal appendage deafness
- Caudal duplication
- Caudal regression syndrome
- Causalgia
- Cavernous hemangioma
- Cavernous lymphangioma
- Cavernous sinus thrombosis
- Cayler syndrome

== Cc–Cd ==
- CCA syndrome
- Ccge syndrome
- CCHS
- CDG syndrome
- CDG syndrome type 1A
- CDG syndrome type 1B
- CDG syndrome type 1C
- CDG syndrome type 2
- CDG syndrome type 3
- CDG syndrome type 4
- CDK4 linked melanoma

== Ce ==
=== Cec–Cep ===
- Cecato De lima Pinheiro syndrome
- Celiac disease epilepsy occipital calcifications
- Celiac sprue
- Cenani–Lenz syndactylism
- Cennamo–Gangemi syndrome
- Central core disease
- Central diabetes insipidus
- Central nervous system protozoal infections
- Central serous chorioretinopathy
- Central type neurofibromatosis
- Centromeric instability immunodeficiency syndrome
- Centronuclear myopathy
- Centrotemporal epilepsy
- Cephalopolysyndactyly

=== Cer ===
==== Cera ====
- Ceramidase deficiency
- Ceramide trihexosidosis
- Ceraunophobia

==== Cere ====
===== Cereb =====
====== Cerebe ======
- Cerebellar agenesis
- Cerebellar ataxia areflexia pes cavus optic atrophy
- Cerebellar ataxia ectodermal dysplasia
- Cerebellar ataxia infantile with progressive external ophthalmoplegia
- Cerebellar ataxia, dominant pure
- Cerebellar degeneration
- Cerebellar degeneration, subacute
- Cerebellar hypoplasia
- Cerebellar hypoplasia endosteal sclerosis
- Cerebellar hypoplasia tapetoretinal degeneration
- Cerebellar parenchymal degeneration
- Cerebelloolivary atrophy
- Cerebelloparenchymal disorder 3
- Cerebellum agenesis hydrocephaly

====== Cerebr ======
- Cerebral amyloid angiopathy
- Cerebral amyloid angiopathy, familial
- Cerebral aneurysm
- Cerebral autosomal dominant arteriopathy with subcortical infarcts and leukoencephalopathy
- Cerebral calcification cerebellar hypoplasia
- Cerebral calcifications opalescent teeth phosphaturia
- Cerebral cavernous malformation
- Cerebral cavernous malformations
- Cerebral gigantism
- Cerebral gigantism jaw cysts
- Cerebral hypoxia
- Cerebral malformations hypertrichosis claw hands
- Cerebral palsy
- Cerebral thrombosis
- Cerebral ventricle neoplasms
- Cerebro facio articular syndrome
- Cerebro facio thoracic dysplasia
- Cerebro oculo dento auriculo skeletal syndrome
- Cerebro oculo genital syndrome
- Cerebro oculo skeleto renal syndrome
- Cerebro reno digital syndrome
- Cerebroarthrodigital syndrome
- Cerebro-costo-mandibular syndrome
- Cerebro-oculo-facio-skeletal syndrome
- Cerebroretinal vasculopathy

==== Cero–Cerv ====
- Ceroid lipofuscinois, neuronal
- Ceroid lipofuscinois, neuronal 1, infantile
- Ceroid lipofuscinois, neuronal 2, late infantile
- Ceroid lipofuscinois, neuronal 3, juvenile
- Ceroid lipofuscinois, neuronal 4, adult type
- Ceroid lipofuscinois, neuronal 5, late infantile
- Ceroid lipofuscinois, neuronal 6, late infantile
- Cervical cancer
- Cervical hypertrichosis neuropathy
- Cervical hypertrichosis peripheral neuropathy
- Cervical ribs sprengel anomaly polydactyly
- Cervical spinal stenosis
- Cervical vertebral fusion
- Cervicooculoacoustic syndrome

== Ch ==
=== Cha ===
==== Chag–Chao ====
- Chagas disease
- Chalazion
- Chanarin disease
- Chanarin–Dorfman syndrome ichthyosis
- Chancroid
- Chandler's syndrome
- Chands syndrome
- Chang–Davidson–Carlson syndrome
- Chaotic atrial tachycardia

==== Char ====
- Char syndrome

===== Charcot =====
Charcot d

- Charcot disease

Charcot–Marie–Tooth disease

- Charcot–Marie–Tooth disease
- Charcot–Marie–Tooth disease deafness dominant type
- Charcot–Marie–Tooth disease deafness mental retardation
- Charcot–Marie–Tooth disease deafness recessive type
- Charcot–Marie–Tooth disease type 1 aplasia cutis congenita
- Charcot–Marie–Tooth disease type 1A
- Charcot–Marie–Tooth disease type 1B
- Charcot–Marie–Tooth disease type 1C
- Charcot–Marie–Tooth disease type 2A
- Charcot–Marie–Tooth disease type 2B1
- Charcot–Marie–Tooth disease type 2B2
- Charcot–Marie–Tooth disease type 2C
- Charcot–Marie–Tooth disease type 2D
- Charcot–Marie–Tooth disease type 4A
- Charcot–Marie–Tooth disease type 4B
- Charcot–Marie–Tooth disease with ptosis and parkinsonism
- Charcot–Marie–Tooth disease, intermediate form
- Charcot–Marie–Tooth disease, neuronal, type A
- Charcot–Marie–Tooth disease, neuronal, type B
- Charcot–Marie–Tooth disease, neuronal, type D
- Charcot–Marie–Tooth disease, X-linked type 2, recessive
- Charcot–Marie–Tooth disease, X-linked type 3, recessive
- Charcot–Marie–Tooth peroneal muscular atrophy, X-linked

===== Charg–Charl =====
- CHARGE syndrome
- Charles' disease
- Charlie M syndrome

==== Chav ====
- Chavany–Brunhes syndrome

=== Che ===
- Chediak–Higashi syndrome
- Cheilitis glandularis
- Cheilitis granulomatosa
- Chemke–Oliver–Mallek syndrome
- Chemodectoma
- Chemophobia
- Chen-Kung Ho–Kaufman–Mcalister syndrome
- Cherubism

=== Chi–Chl ===
- Chiari type 1 malformation
- Chiari–Frommel syndrome
- Chickenpox
- Chikungunya
- CHILD syndrome ichthyosis
- Childhood disintegrative disorder
- Childhood pustular psoriasis
- Chimerism
- Chinese restaurant syndrome
- Chitayat–Haj–Chahine syndrome
- Chitayat–Meunier–Hodgkinson syndrome
- Chitayat–Moore–Del Bigio syndrome
- Chitty–Hall–Baraitser syndrome
- Chitty–Hall–Webb syndrome
- Chlamydia
- Chlamydia pneumoniae
- Chlamydia trachomatis
- Chlamydial and gonococcal conjunctivitis

=== Cho ===
==== Choa–Chol ====
- Choanal atresia deafness cardiac defects dysmorphia
- Cholangiocarcinoma
- Cholangitis, primary sclerosing
- Cholecystitis
- Choledochal cyst, hand malformation
- Cholelithiasis
- Cholemia, familial
- Cholera
- Cholestasis
- Cholestasis pigmentary retinopathy cleft palate
- Cholestasis, progressive familial intrahepatic
- Cholestasis, progressive familial intrahepatic 1
- Cholestasis, progressive familial intrahepatic 2
- Cholestasis, progressive familial intrahepatic 3
- Cholestatic jaundice renal tubular insufficiency
- Cholesterol ester storage disease
- Cholesterol esterification disorder
- Cholesterol pneumonia

==== Chon ====
- Chondroblastoma
- Chondrocalcinosis
- Chondrocalcinosis familial articular
- Chondrodysplasia lethal recessive
- Chondrodysplasia pseudohermaphrodism syndrome
- Chondrodysplasia punctata
- Chondrodysplasia punctata 1, x-linked recessive
- Chondrodysplasia punctata with steroid sulfatase deficiency
- Chondrodysplasia punctata, brachytelephalangic
- Chondrodysplasia punctata, Sheffield type
- Chondrodysplasia situs inversus imperforate anus polydactyly
- Chondrodysplasia, Grebe type
- Chondrodystrophy
- Chondroectodermal dysplasia
- Chondroma (benign)
- Chondromalacia
- Chondromatosis (benign)
- Chondrosarcoma (malignant)
- Chondrysplasia punctata, humero-metacarpal type

==== Chor ====
- Chordoma
- Chorea
- Chorea acanthocytosis
- Chorea familial benign
- Chorea minor
- Choreoacanthocytosis amyotrophic
- Choreoathetosis familial paroxysmal
- Choriocarcinoma
- Chorioretinitis
- Chorioretinopathy dominant form microcephaly
- Choroid plexus cyst
- Choroid plexus neoplasms
- Choroidal atrophy alopecia
- Choroideremia
- Choroideremia hypopituitarism
- Choroiditis
- Choroiditis, serpiginous
- Choroido cerebral calcification syndrome infantile

=== Chr ===
==== Chri ====
- Christian–Demyer–Franken syndrome
- Christian–Johnson–Angenieta syndrome
- Christian syndrome
- Christianson–Fourie syndrome
- Christmas disease

==== Chro ====
===== Chrom =====
- Chromhidrosis

====== Chromo ======
Chromom–Chromop

- Chromomycosis
- Chromophobe renal carcinoma

Chromos Chromosoma

- Chromosomal triplication

Chromosome Chromosome 1

- Chromosome 1 ring
- Chromosome 1, 1p36 deletion syndrome
- Chromosome 1, deletion q21 q25
- Chromosome 1, duplication 1p21 p32
- Chromosome 1, monosomy 1p
- Chromosome 1, monosomy 1p22 p13
- Chromosome 1, monosomy 1p31 p22
- Chromosome 1, monosomy 1p32
- Chromosome 1, monosomy 1p34 p32
- Chromosome 1, monosomy 1q25 q32
- Chromosome 1, monosomy 1q32 q42
- Chromosome 1, monosomy 1q4
- Chromosome 1, q42 11 q42 12 duplication
- Chromosome 1, trisomy 1q32 qter
- Chromosome 1, trisomy 1q42 qter
- Chromosome 1, uniparental disomy 1q12 q21

Chromosome 10 – Chromosome 12

- Chromosome 10 ring
- Chromosome 10, distal trisomy 10q
- Chromosome 10, monosomy 10p
- Chromosome 10, monosomy 10q
- Chromosome 10, trisomy 10p
- Chromosome 10, trisomy 10pter p13
- Chromosome 10, trisomy 10q
- Chromosome 10, uniparental disomy of
- Chromosome 10p terminal deletion syndrome
- Chromosome 11, deletion 11p
- Chromosome 11, partial trisomy 11q
- Chromosome 11-14 translocation
- Chromosome 11p, partial deletion
- Chromosome 11q partial deletion
- Chromosome 11q trisomy
- Chromosome 12 ring
- Chromosome 12, 12p trisomy
- Chromosome 12, trisomy 12q
- Chromosome 12p deletion
- Chromosome 12p partial deletion

Chromosome 13 – Chromosome 15

- Chromosome 13 duplication
- Chromosome 13 ring
- Chromosome 13, partial monosomy 13q
- Chromosome 13p duplication
- Chromosome 13q deletion
- Chromosome 13q trisomy
- Chromosome 13q-mosaicism
- Chromosome 14 ring
- Chromosome 14 trisomy
- Chromosome 14, deletion 14q, partial duplication 14p
- Chromosome 14, trisomy mosaic
- Chromosome 14q, partial deletions
- Chromosome 14q, proximal duplication
- Chromosome 14q, terminal deletion
- Chromosome 14q, terminal duplication
- Chromosome 15 ring
- Chromosome 15, distal trisomy 15q
- Chromosome 15, trisomy mosaicism
- Chromosome 15q, partial deletion
- Chromosome 15q, tetrasomy
- Chromosome 15q, trisomy

Chromosome 16 – Chromosome 1q

- Chromosome 16, trisomy 16p
- Chromosome 16, trisomy 16q
- Chromosome 16, trisomy
- Chromosome 16, uniparental disomy
- Chromosome 17 trisomy
- Chromosome 17 deletion
- Chromosome 17 ring
- Chromosome 17, deletion 17q23 q24
- Chromosome 17, trisomy 17p
- Chromosome 17, trisomy 17p11 2
- Chromosome 17, trisomy 17q22
- Chromosome 18 long arm deletion syndrome
- Chromosome 18 mosaic monosomy
- Chromosome 18 ring
- Chromosome 18, deletion 18q23
- Chromosome 18, monosomy 18p
- Chromosome 18, tetrasomy 18p
- Chromosome 18, trisomy 18p
- Chromosome 18, trisomy 18q
- Chromosome 18, trisomy
- Chromosome 19 ring
- Chromosome 19, trisomy 19q
- Chromosome 1q, duplication 1q12 q21

Chromosome 2

- Chromosome 2, monosomy 2p22
- Chromosome 2, monosomy 2pter p24
- Chromosome 2, monosomy 2q
- Chromosome 2, monosomy 2q24
- Chromosome 2, monosomy 2q37
- Chromosome 2, trisomy 2p
- Chromosome 2, Trisomy 2p13 p21
- Chromosome 2, trisomy 2pter p24
- Chromosome 2, trisomy 2q
- Chromosome 2, trisomy 2q37

Chromosome 20 – Chromosome 22

- Chromosome 20 ring
- Chromosome 20, deletion 20p
- Chromosome 20, duplication 20p
- Chromosome 20, trisomy
- Chromosome 21 monosomy
- Chromosome 21 ring
- Chromosome 21, monosomy 21q22
- Chromosome 21, tetrasomy 21q
- Chromosome 21, uniparental disomy of
- Chromosome 22 ring
- Chromosome 22 trisomy mosaic
- Chromosome 22, microdeletion 22 q11
- Chromosome 22, monosome mosaic
- Chromosome 22, trisomy q11 q13
- Chromosome 22, trisomy

Chromosome 3

- Chromosome 3 duplication syndrome
- Chromosome 3, monosomy 3p
- Chromosome 3, monosomy 3p14 p11
- Chromosome 3, monosomy 3p2
- Chromosome 3, monosomy 3p25
- Chromosome 3, monosomy 3q13
- Chromosome 3, monosomy 3q21 23
- Chromosome 3, monosomy 3q27
- Chromosome 3, trisomy 3p
- Chromosome 3, trisomy 3p25
- Chromosome 3, trisomy 3q
- Chromosome 3, trisomy 3q13 2 q25
- Chromosome 3, Trisomy 3q2

Chromosome 4 – Chromosome 5

- Chromosome 4 ring
- Chromosome 4 short arm deletion
- Chromosome 4, monosomy 4p14 p16
- Chromosome 4, monosomy 4q
- Chromosome 4, monosomy 4q32
- Chromosome 4, monosomy distal 4q
- Chromosome 4, partial trisomy distal 4q
- Chromosome 4, Trisomy 4p
- Chromosome 4, trisomy 4q
- Chromosome 4, trisomy 4q21
- Chromosome 4, trisomy 4q25 qter
- Chromosome 5, monosomy 5q35
- Chromosome 5, trisomy 5p
- Chromosome 5, trisomy 5pter p13 3
- Chromosome 5, trisomy 5q
- Chromosome 5, uniparental disomy

Chromosome 6 – Chromosome 7

- Chromosome 6 ring
- Chromosome 6, deletion 6q13 q15
- Chromosome 6, monosomy 6p23
- Chromosome 6, monosomy 6q
- Chromosome 6, monosomy 6q1
- Chromosome 6, monosomy 6q2
- Chromosome 6, partial trisomy 6q
- Chromosome 6, trisomy 6p
- Chromosome 6, trisomy 6q
- Chromosome 7 ring
- Chromosome 7, monosomy 7q2
- Chromosome 7, monosomy 7q21
- Chromosome 7, monosomy 7q3
- Chromosome 7, monosomy
- Chromosome 7, partial monosomy 7p
- Chromosome 7, trisomy 7p
- Chromosome 7, trisomy 7p13 p12 2
- Chromosome 7, trisomy 7q
- Chromosome 7, trisomy mosaic

Chromosome 8 – Chromosome 9

- Chromosome 8 deletion
- Chromosome 8 ring
- Chromosome 8, monosomy 8p
- Chromosome 8, monosomy 8p2
- Chromosome 8, monosomy 8p23 1
- Chromosome 8, monosomy 8q
- Chromosome 8, mosaic trisomy
- Chromosome 8, partial trisomy
- Chromosome 8, trisomy 8p
- Chromosome 8, trisomy 8q
- Chromosome 8, trisomy
- Chromosome 9 inversion or duplication
- Chromosome 9 Ring
- Chromosome 9, duplication 9q21
- Chromosome 9, monosomy 9p
- Chromosome 9, partial monosomy 9p
- Chromosome 9, partial trisomy 9p
- Chromosome 9, tetrasomy 9p
- Chromosome 9, trisomy 9q
- Chromosome 9, trisomy 9q32
- Chromosome 9, trisomy mosaic
- Chromosome 9, trisomy

Chromosomes

- Chromosomes 1 and 2, monosomy 2q duplication 1p

===== Chron =====
- Chronic berylliosis
- Chronic bronchitis
- Chronic demyelinizing neuropathy with IgM monoclonal
- Chronic erosive gastritis
- Chronic fatigue immune dysfunction syndrome
- Chronic fatigue syndrome
- Chronic granulomatous disease
- Chronic hiccup
- Chronic inflammatory demyelinating polyneuropathy
- Chronic lymphocytic leukemia
- Chronic mountain sickness
- Chronic mucocutaneous candidiasis
- Chronic myelogenous leukemia
- Chronic myelomonocytic leukemia
- Chronic necrotizing vasculitis
- Chronic neutropenia
- Chronic obstructive pulmonary disease
- Chronic polyradiculoneuritis
- Chronic recurrent multifocal osteomyelitis
- Chronic renal failure
- Chronic spasmodic dysphonia
- Chronic, infantile, neurological, cutaneous, articular syndrome

=== Chu–Chy ===
- Chudley–Lowry–Hoar syndrome
- Chudley–Rozdilsky syndrome
- Chudley–Mccullough syndrome
- Churg–Strauss syndrome
- Chylous ascites

== Ci ==
- Cicatricial pemphigoid
- Ciguatera fish poisoning
- Ciliary discoordination, due to random ciliary orientation
- Ciliary dyskinesia, due to transposition of ciliary microtubules
- Ciliary dyskinesia-bronchiectasis
- Cilliers–Beighton syndrome
- Cinchonism
- Circumscribed cutaneous aplasia of the vertex
- Circumscribed disseminated keratosis Jadassohn–Lew type
- Citrullinemia

== Cl ==
=== Cla ===
- Clarkson disease
- Clayton–Smith–Donnai syndrome

=== Cle ===
==== Clef ====
===== Cleft =====
====== Cleft h – Cleft l ======
- Cleft hand absent tibia
- Cleft lip
- Cleft lip and palate malrotation cardiopathy
- Cleft lip and/or palate with mucous cysts of lower
- Cleft lip palate abnormal thumbs microcephaly
- Cleft lip palate deafness sacral lipoma
- Cleft lip palate dysmorphism Kumar type
- Cleft lip palate ectrodactyly
- Cleft lip palate incisor and finger anomalies
- Cleft lip palate mental retardation corneal opacity
- Cleft lip palate oligodontia syndactyly pili torti
- Cleft lip palate pituitary deficiency
- Cleft lip palate-tetraphocomelia
- Cleft lip with or without cleft palate
- Cleft lower lip cleft lateral canthi chorioretinal

====== Cleft p – Cleft u ======
- Cleft palate
- Cleft palate cardiac defect ectrodactyly
- Cleft palate colobomata radial synostosis deafness
- Cleft palate heart disease polydactyly absent tibia
- Cleft palate lateral synechia syndrome
- Cleft palate short stature vertebral anomalies
- Cleft palate stapes fixation oligodontia
- Cleft palate X linked
- Cleft tongue syndrome
- Cleft upper lip median cutaneous polyps

====== Clefti ======
- Clefting ectropion conical teeth

==== Clei ====
- Cleidocranial dysplasia
- Cleidocranial dysplasia micrognathia absent thumbs

=== Cli–Clu ===
- Cloacal exstrophy
- Clonal hypereosinophilia
- Clouston syndrome
- Cloverleaf skull bone dysplasia
- Cloverleaf skull micromelia thoracic dysplasia
- Clubfoot
- Cluster headache

== Cm ==
- CMV antenatal infection

== Co ==
=== Coa–Cof ===
- COACH syndrome
- Coal workers' pneumoconiosis
- Coarctation of aorta dominant
- Coarse face hypotonia constipation
- Coats disease
- Cocaine antenatal infection
- Cocaine dependence
- Cocaine fetopathy
- Cocaine intoxication
- Coccidioidomycosis
- Cochin Jewish Disorder
- Cockayne syndrome type 1
- Cockayne syndrome type 2
- Cockayne syndrome type 3
- Cockayne's syndrome
- CODAS syndrome
- Codesette syndrome
- Coeliac disease
- Coenzyme Q cytochrome c reductase deficiency of
- Coffin–Lowry syndrome
- Coffin–Siris syndrome
- COFS syndrome

=== Cog–Coh ===
- Cogan–Reese syndrome
- Cogan syndrome
- Cohen-Gibson syndrome
- Cohen–Hayden syndrome
- Cohen–Lockood–Wyborney syndrome
- Cohen syndrome

=== Col ===
==== Cola–Coll ====
- Colavita–Kozlowski syndrome
- Cold abscess
- Cold agglutination syndrome
- Cold agglutinin disease
- Cold antibody hemolytic anemia
- Cold contact urticaria
- Cold urticaria
- Cole carpenter syndrome
- Coleman–Thome syndrome
- Colitis
- Collagen disorder
- Collagenous colitis
- Collaural fistula
- Collins–Pope syndrome
- Collins–Sakati syndrome

==== Colo–Colv ====
- Coloboma chorioretinal cerebellar vermis aplasia
- Coloboma hair abnormality
- Coloboma of choroid and retina
- Coloboma of eye lens
- Coloboma of iris
- Coloboma of lens ala nasi
- Coloboma of macula-brachydactyly type B syndrome
- Coloboma of macula
- Coloboma of optic nerve
- Coloboma of optic papilla
- Coloboma porencephaly hydronephrosis
- Coloboma uveal with cleft lip palate and mental retardation
- Coloboma, ocular
- Colobomata unilobar lung heart defect
- Colobomatous microphthalmia heart disease hearing
- Colobomatous microphthalmia
- Colon cancer, familial nonpolyposis
- Colonic atresia
- Colonic malakoplakia
- Color blindness
- Colorado tick fever
- Colver–Steer–Godman syndrome

=== Com ===
- Combarros–Calleja–Leno syndrome
- Combined hyperlipidemia, familial
- Combined malonic and methylmalonic aciduria
- Common cold
- Common mesentery
- Common variable immunodeficiency
- Compartment syndrome
- Complement component 2 deficiency
- Complement component receptor 1
- Complete atrioventricular canal
- Complex 1 mitochondrial respiratory chain deficiency
- Complex 2 mitochondrial respiratory chain deficiency
- Complex 3 mitochondrial respiratory chain deficiency
- Complex 4 mitochondrial respiratory chain deficiency
- Complex 5 mitochondrial respiratory chain deficiency
- Complex regional pain syndrome

=== Con ===
==== Cond–Cone ====
- Conduct disorder
- Conductive deafness malformed external ear
- Conductive hearing loss
- Condyloma acuminatum
- Condylomata lata
- Cone dystrophy
- Cone rod dystrophy amelogenesis imperfecta
- Cone-rod dystrophy

==== Cong ====
===== Conge =====
====== Congen ======
Congenital a – Congenital b

- Congenital absence of the uterus and vagina
- Congenital adrenal hyperplasia
  - Congenital adrenal hyperplasia due to 11β-hydroxylase deficiency
  - Congenital adrenal hyperplasia due to 17 alpha-hydroxylase deficiency
  - Congenital adrenal hyperplasia due to 21-hydroxylase deficiency
  - Congenital adrenal hyperplasia due to 3 beta-hydroxysteroid dehydrogenase deficiency
  - Congenital adrenal hyperplasia, lipoid
- Congenital afibrinogenemia
- Congenital alopecia X linked
- Congenital amputation
- Congenital aneurysms of the great vessels
- Congenital antithrombin III deficiency
- Congenital aplastic anemia
- Congenital arteriovenous shunt
- Congenital articular rigidity
- Congenital benign spinal muscular atrophy dominant
- Congenital brain disorder
- Congenital bronchobiliary fistula

Congenital c – Congenital g

- Congenital cardiovascular disorder
- Congenital cardiovascular malformations
- Congenital cardiovascular shunt
- Congenital central hypoventilation syndrome
- Congenital constricting band
- Congenital contractural arachnodactyly
- Congenital contractures
- Congenital craniosynostosis maternal hyperthyroiditis
- Congenital cystic adenomatoid malformation
- Congenital cystic eye multiple ocular and intracranial anomalies
- Congenital cytomegalovirus
- Congenital deafness
- Congenital diaphragmatic hernia
- Congenital disorder of glycosylation
- Congenital dyserythropoietic anemia
- Congenital erythropoietic porphyria
- Congenital facial diplegia
- Congenital fiber type disproportion
- Congenital gastrointestinal disorder
- Congenital generalized fibromatosis
- Congenital giant megaureter

Congenital h – Congenital l

- Congenital heart block
- Congenital heart disease ptosis hypodontia craniostosis
- Congenital heart disease radio ulnar synostosis mental retardation
- Congenital heart disorder
- Congenital heart septum defect
- Congenital hemidysplasia with ichthyosiform erythroderma and limbs defects
- Congenital hemolytic anemia
- Congenital hepatic fibrosis
- Congenital hepatic porphyria
- Congenital herpes simplex
- Congenital hypomyelination neuropathy
- Congenital hypothyroidism
- Congenital hypotrichosis milia
- Congenital ichthyosis, microcephalus, qriplegia
- Congenital ichthyosis
- Congenital ichtyosiform erythroderma
- Congenital insensitivity to pain with anhidrosis
- Congenital kidney disorder
- Congenital limb deficiency
- Congenital lobar emphysema

Congenital m – Congenital s

- Congenital megacolon
- Congenital megaloureter
- Congenital mesoblastic nephroma
- Congenital microvillous atrophy
- Congenital mitral malformation
- Congenital mitral stenosis
- Congenital mixovirus
- Congenital mumps
- Congenital muscular dystrophy syringomyelia
- Congenital myopathy
- Congenital nephrotic syndrome
- Congenital nonhemolytic jaundice
- Congenital rubella
- Congenital short bowel
- Congenital short femur
- Congenital skeletal disorder
- Congenital skin disorder
- Congenital spherocytic anemia
- Congenital spherocytic hemolytic anemia
- Congenital stenosis of cervical medullary canal
- Congenital sucrose isomaltose malabsorption
- Congenital syphilis

Congenital t – Congenital v

- Congenital toxoplasmosis
- Congenital unilateral pulmonary hypoplasia
- Congenital vagal hyperreflexivity
- Congenital varicella syndrome

====== Conges ======
- Congestive heart failure

===== Conju =====
- Conjunctivitis ligneous
- Conjunctivitis with pseudomembrane
- Conjunctivitis

==== Conn–Conv ====
- Connective tissue dysplasia Spellacy type
- Connexin 26 anomaly
- Conn's syndrome
- Conotruncal heart malformations
- Conradi–Hünermann syndrome
- Constitutional growth delay
- Constrictive bronchiolitis
- Contact dermatitis

- Contact dermatitis, allergic
- Contact dermatitis, irritant
- Contact dermatitis, photocontact

- Continuous muscle fiber activity hereditary
- Continuous spike-wave during slow sleep syndrome
- Contractural arachnodactyly
- Contractures ectodermal dysplasia cleft lip palate
- Contractures hyperkeratosis lethal
- Contractures of feet-muscle atrophy-oculomotor apraxia
- Conversion disorder
- Convulsions benign familial neonatal dominant form
- Convulsions benign familial neonatal

=== Coo–Cop ===
- Cooks syndrome
- Cooley's anemia
- Copper deficiency familial benign
- Copper transport disease
- Coproporhyria

=== Cor ===
- Cor biloculare
- Cor pulmonale
- Cor triatriatum

==== Corm–Coro ====
- Cormier–Rustin–Munnich syndrome
- Corneal anesthesia deafness mental retardation
- Corneal cerebellar syndrome
- Corneal crystals myopathy neuropathy
- Corneal dystrophy
- Corneal endothelium dystrophy
- Cornelia de Lange syndrome
- Corneodermatoosseous syndrome
- Coronal synostosis syndactyly jejunal atresia
- Coronaro-cardiac fistula
- Coronary arteries congenital malformation
- Coronary artery aneurysm
- Coronary heart disease
- Coronavirus disease 2019

==== Corp–Cort ====
- Corpus callosum agenesis
- Corpus callosum dysgenesis
- Corsello–Opitz syndrome
- Cortada–Koussef–Matsumoto syndrome
- Cortes-Lacassie syndrome
- Cortical blindness mental retardation polydactyly
- Cortical degeneration of the cerebellum parenchymatous
- Cortical dysplasia
- Cortical hyperostosis syndactyly
- Corticobasal degeneration

=== Cos–Cox ===
- Costello syndrome
- Costochondritis (otherwise Costal chondritis)
- Costocoracoid ligament congenitally short
- Cote–Adamopoulos–Pantelakis syndrome
- Cote–Katsantoni syndrome
- Cousin–Walbraum–Cegarra syndrome
- Covesdem syndrome
- Cowchock–Wapner–Kurtz syndrome
- Cowden syndrome
- Cowpox
- Coxoauricular syndrome

== Cr ==
=== Cra ===
==== Cram ====
- Cramer–Niederdellmann syndrome
- Cramp
- Cramp fasciculation syndrome

==== Cran ====
===== Crand–Crane =====
- Crandall syndrome
- Crane–Heise syndrome

===== Crani =====
====== Cranio ======
- Cranio osteoarthropathy

Cranioa–Craniom

- Cranioacrofacial syndrome
- Craniodiaphyseal dysplasia
- Craniodigital syndrome mental retardation
- Cranioectodermal dysplasia
- Craniofacial and osseous defects mental retardation
- Craniofacial and skeletal defects
- Craniofacial deafness hand syndrome
- Craniofacial dysostosis arthrogryposis progeroid appearance
- Craniofacial dysostosis
- Craniofacial dysynostosis
- Craniofaciocardioskeletal syndrome
- Craniofaciocervical osteoglyphic dysplasia
- Craniofrontonasal dysplasia
- Craniofrontonasal syndrome Teebi type
- Craniometaphyseal dysplasia dominant type
- Craniometaphyseal dysplasia recessive type
- Craniomicromelic syndrome

Cranios–Craniot

- Craniostenosis cataract
- Craniostenosis with congenital heart disease mental retardation
- Craniostenosis
- Craniosynostosis alopecia brain defect
- Craniosynostosis arthrogryposis cleft palate
- Craniosynostosis autosomal dominant
- Craniosynostosis cleft lip palate arthrogryposis
- Craniosynostosis contractures cleft
- Craniosynostosis exostoses nevus epibulbar dermoid
- Craniosynostosis fibular aplasia
- Craniosynostosis Fontaine type
- Craniosynostosis Maroteaux Fonfria type
- Craniosynostosis mental retardation clefting syndrome
- Craniosynostosis mental retardation heart defects
- Craniosynostosis Philadelphia type
- Craniosynostosis radial aplasia syndrome
- Craniosynostosis synostoses hypertensive nephropathy
- Craniosynostosis Warman type
- Craniosynostosis, sagittal, with Dandy-Walker malformation and hydrocephalus
- Craniosynostosis
- Craniotelencephalic dysplasia

==== Craw ====
- Crawfurd syndrome

=== Cre–Cro ===
- Creatine deficiency
- Creeping disease
- CREST syndrome (Calcinosis Raynaud's Esophagus Sclerodactyly Telangiectasia)
- Cretinism athyreotic
- Cretinism
- Creutzfeldt–Jakob disease
- Cri du chat syndrome a.k.a. cat's cry or 5P- (5P minus) syndrome
- Crigler–Najjar syndrome
- Crisponi syndrome
- Criss-cross syndrome
- Criswick–Schepens syndrome
- Crohn's disease of the esophagus
- Crohn's disease
- Crome syndrome
- Cronkhite–Canada syndrome
- Crossed polydactyly type 1
- Crossed polysyndactyly
- Croup
- Crouzon syndrome
- Crouzonodermoskeletal syndrome
- Crow–Fukase syndrome

=== Cry ===
- Cryoglobulinemia
- Cryophobia
- Cryptococcosis
- Cryptogenic organized pneumopathy
- Cryptomicrotia brachydactyly syndrome excess fingers
- Cryptomicrotia brachydactyly syndrome
- Cryptophthalmos-syndactyly syndrome
- Cryptosporidiosis
- Cryptorchidism arachnodactyly mental retardation
- Cryroglobulinemia
- Crystal deposit disease

== Cu ==
=== Cul–Cus ===
- Culler–Jones syndrome
- Curly hair ankyloblepharon nail dysplasia syndrome
- Currarino triad
- Curry–Hall syndrome
- Curry–Jones syndrome
- Curth–Macklin type ichthyosis hystrix
- Curtis–Rogers–Stevenson syndrome
- Cushing syndrome, familial
- Cushing's symphalangism
- Cushing's syndrome

=== Cut ===
- Cutaneous anthrax
- Cutaneous larva migrans
- Cutaneous lupus erythematosus
- Cutaneous photosensitivity colitis lethal
- Cutaneous T-cell lymphoma
- Cutaneous vascularitis
- Cutis Gyrata syndrome of Beare and Stevenson
- Cutis gyratum acanthosis nigricans craniosynostosis
- Cutis laxa

- Cutis laxa, recessive
- Cutis laxa corneal clouding mental retardation
- Cutis laxa osteoporosis
- Cutis laxa with joint laxity and retarded development
- Cutis laxa, dominant type
- Cutis laxa, recessive type 1
- Cutis laxa, recessive type 2

- Cutis marmorata telangiectatica congenita
- Cutis verticis gyrata mental deficiency
- Cutis verticis gyrata thyroid aplasia mental retardation
- Cutis verticis gyrata
- Cutler Bass Romshe syndrome

== Cy–Cz ==
- Cyanide poisoning
- Cyclic neutropenia
- Cyclic vomiting syndrome
- Cyclosporosis
- Cyclothymia
- Cyprus facial neuromusculoskeletal syndrome
- Cystathionine beta synthetase deficiency
- Cystic adenomatoid malformation of lung
- Cystic angiomatosis of bone, diffuse
- Cystic fibrosis gastritis megaloblastic anemia
- Cystic fibrosis
- Cystic hamartoma of lung and kidney
- Cystic hygroma lethal cleft palate
- Cystic hygroma
- Cystic medial necrosis of aorta
- Cysticercosis
- Cystin transport, protein defect of
- Cystinosis
- Cystinuria
- Cystinuria-lysinuria
- Cytochrome C oxidase deficiency
- Cytomegalic inclusion disease
- Cytomegalovirus
- Cytoplasmic body myopathy
- Czeizel–Losonci syndrome
- Czeizel syndrome
