= Prune belly syndrome =

- Other names: Abdominal muscle deficiency syndrome, congenital absence of the abdominal muscles, Eagle-Barrett syndrome, Obrinsky syndrome, Fröhlich syndrome, triad syndrome
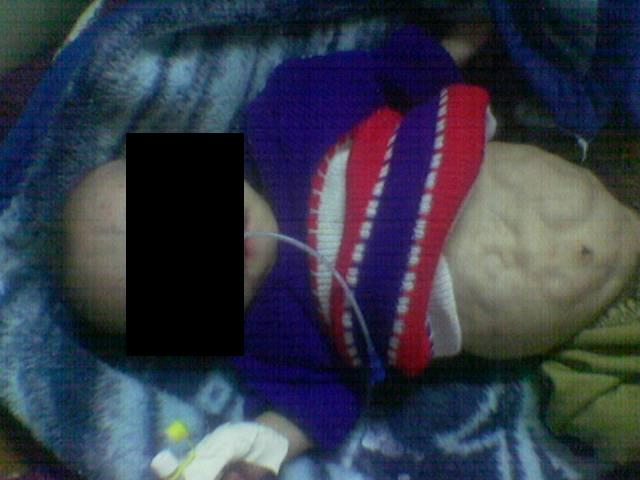
- Prune belly syndrome in an Egyptian child with Down syndrome.
- Specialty: Medical genetics

Prune belly syndrome (PBS) is a rare, genetic birth defect affecting about 1 in 40,000 births. About 97% of those affected are male. Prune belly syndrome is a congenital disorder of the urinary system, characterized by a triad of symptoms. The syndrome is named for the mass of wrinkled skin that is often (but not always) present on the abdomen of those with the disorder.

== Signs and symptoms ==
Prune-belly triad consists of signs such as:

- A partial or complete lack of abdominal wall muscles. There may be wrinkly folds of skin covering the abdomen.
- Cryptorchidism (undescended testicles) in males
- Urinary tract abnormality such as unusually large ureters, distended bladder, accumulation and backflow of urine from the bladder to the ureters and the kidneys (vesicoureteral reflux)

Other signs include:

- Frequent urinary tract infections due to the inability to properly expel urine
- Ventricular septal defect
- Malrotation of the gut
- Club foot
- Later in life, a common symptom is post-ejaculatory discomfort. Most likely a bladder spasm, it lasts about two hours.
- Musculoskeletal abnormalities include pectus excavatum, scoliosis, and congenital joint dislocations including the hip. Diagnosis of prune belly syndrome necessitates a thorough orthopaedic evaluation because of the high prevalence of associated musculoskeletal abnormalities.
- Pulmonary hypoplasia, pneumonia, and atelectasis involving lung lobes

=== Complications ===
Prune belly syndrome can result in distention and enlargement of internal organs such as the bladder and intestines. Surgery is often required but will not return the organs to a normal size. Bladder reductions have shown that the bladder will again stretch to its previous size due to lack of muscle. Complications may also arise from enlarged/malformed kidneys, which may result in kidney failure and the child's going on dialysis or requiring a kidney transplant.

== Diagnosis ==
Prune belly syndrome can be diagnosed via ultrasound while a child is still in-utero. Urinary tract dilation, bladder outlet obstruction, distended bladder wall and an abnormally large abdominal cavity with deficient abdominal wall musculature are key indicators, as the abdomen swells with the pressure of accumulated urine.

In young children, frequent urinary tract infections often herald prune belly syndrome, as they are normally uncommon. If a problem is suspected, doctors can perform blood tests to check renal function. Another study that may suggest the syndrome is a voiding cystourethrogram.

PBS is far more common in males. Autosomal recessive inheritance has been suggested in some cases. A homozygous mutation in the muscarinic cholinergic receptor-3 gene (CHRM3) on chromosome 1q43 was reported in one family.

== Treatment ==
The type of treatment, like that of most disorders, depends on the severity of the symptoms. One option is to perform a vesicostomy, which allows the bladder to drain through a small hole in the abdomen, thus helping to prevent urinary tract infections. Similarly, consistent self-catheterization, often several times per day, can be an effective approach to preventing infections. A more drastic procedure is a surgical "remodeling" of the abdominal wall and urinary tract. Boys often need to undergo an orchiopexy to move the testes to their proper place in the scrotum.
