= Autosome =

Any chromosome other than a sex chromosome

An autosome is any chromosome that is not a sex chromosome. The members of an autosome pair in a diploid cell typically have the same morphology (homomorphic), unlike those in allosomal (sex chromosome) pairs, which may have different structures. The DNA in autosomes is collectively known as atDNA or auDNA.

== Nomenclature ==
The number of autosomal chromosomes an organism has can vary across species and cell types. They are typically identified by sequential numbers beginning with 1 (as opposed to the sex chromosomes which are indicated by letters).

In diploid organisms, a somatic cell will contain two copies of each autosomal chromosome, one from each parent while germline cells (eggs or sperm) will typically contain a single copy of each autosome. The homologous chromosome pairs are identified with the same number (e.g. a somatic cell will have two copies of chromosome 1, two copies of chromosome 2...).

=== Humans ===
The human genome contains 44 autosomal chromosomes, or as a diploid organism, 22 pairs of homologous autosomes that are numbered 1-22. These autosome pairs were labeled with numbers (1–22 in humans) roughly in order of their sizes in base pairs.

All human autosomes have been identified and mapped by extracting the chromosomes from a cell arrested in metaphase or prometaphase and then staining them with a type of dye (most commonly, Giemsa). These chromosomes are typically viewed as karyograms for easy comparison. Clinical geneticists can compare the karyogram of an individual to a reference karyogram to discover the cytogenetic basis of certain phenotypes. For example, the karyogram of someone with Patau Syndrome would show that they possess three copies of chromosome 13. Karyograms and staining techniques can only detect large-scale disruptions to chromosomes—chromosomal aberrations smaller than a few million base pairs generally cannot be seen on a karyogram.

Karyotype of human chromosomes
Female (XX)	Male (XY)
There are two copies of each autosome (chromosomes 1–22) in both females and males. The sex chromosomes are different: There are two copies of the X-chromosome in females, but males have a single X-chromosome and a Y-chromosome.

Autosomes still contain sexual determination genes even though they are not sex chromosomes. For example, mutations of the SOX9 gene on chromosome 17 can cause humans with a typical Y chromosome to develop as females. The transcription factor TDF (encoded by the SRY gene on the Y sex chromosome), a protein vital for male sex determination during development, functions by activating SOX9, while the mutation on SOX9 causes the gene to be activated without the TDR transcription factor.

=== Yeast ===
The yeast (S. cerevisiae) genome has 16 chromosomes in its haploid state (32 in its diploid state). However, unlike other organisms, they are officially numbered with roman numerals (I to XVI). As an organism being studied before the development of technologies for directly observing and counting chromosomes, their chromosome numbering was based on the order of their discovery in the 1950's rather than by their lengths. When the entire genome was published in 1996 as the first eukaryote to have its entire genome sequenced, the roman numeral-based naming convention was continued by naming each assembled chromsome in the reference "chrI", "chrII", ... "chrVXI."

== Autosomal genetic disorders ==
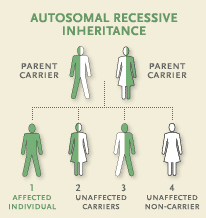
An illustration of the inheritance pattern and phenotypic effects of an autosomal recessive gene.

Autosomal genetic disorders can arise due to a number of causes, some of the most common being nondisjunction in parental germ cells or Mendelian inheritance of deleterious alleles from parents. Autosomal genetic disorders which exhibit Mendelian inheritance can be inherited either in an autosomal dominant or recessive fashion. These disorders manifest in and are passed on by either sex with equal frequency. Autosomal dominant disorders are often present in both parent and child, as the child needs to inherit only one copy of the deleterious allele to manifest the disease. Autosomal recessive diseases, however, require two copies of the deleterious allele for the disease to manifest. Because it is possible to possess one copy of a deleterious allele without presenting a disease phenotype, two phenotypically normal parents can have a child with the disease if both parents are carriers (also known as heterozygotes) for the condition.

Autosomal aneuploidy can also result in disease conditions. Aneuploidy of autosomes is not well tolerated and usually results in miscarriage of the developing fetus. Fetuses with aneuploidy of gene-rich chromosomes—such as chromosome 1—never survive to term, and fetuses with aneuploidy of gene-poor chromosomes—such as chromosome 21— are still miscarried over 23% of the time. Possessing a single copy of an autosome (known as a monosomy) is nearly always incompatible with life, though very rarely some monosomies can survive past birth. Having three copies of an autosome (known as a trisomy) is far more compatible with life, however. A common example is Down syndrome (trisomy 21), which is caused by possessing three copies of chromosome 21 instead of the usual two. Other examples of human autosomal trisomy with documented cases of surviving to term include Edwards syndrome (trisomy 18), Patau syndrome (trisomy 13), Warkany syndrome 2 (trisomy 8) Trisomy 9, and Trisomy 22 which are associated with number of disorders.

Partial aneuploidy can also occur as a result of unbalanced translocations during meiosis. Deletions of part of a chromosome cause partial monosomies, while duplications can cause partial trisomies. If the duplication or deletion is large enough, it can be discovered by analyzing a karyogram of the individual. Autosomal translocations can be responsible for a number of diseases, ranging from cancer to schizophrenia. Unlike single gene disorders, diseases caused by aneuploidy are the result of improper gene dosage, not nonfunctional gene product.

== See also ==
- Aneuploidy (abnormal number of chromosomes)
- Autosomal dominant
- Autosomal recessive
- Homologous chromosome
- Pseudoautosomal region
- XY sex-determination system
- Genetic disorder
