= Stippled epiphyses =

Stippled epiphyses is a pattern of focal bone calcification.

The presence of abnormal punctate (speckled, dot-like) calcifications in one or more epiphyses.

It is seen in chondrodysplasia punctata and in Keutel syndrome. It is also caused by use of warfarin, alcohol, and in hypothyroidism.
