= ATP1A3 =

Protein-coding gene in humans

Identifiers
- Aliases: ATP1A3, AHC2, DYT12, RDP, CAPOS, ATPase Na+/K+ transporting subunit alpha 3, ATP1A1, DEE99
- External IDs: OMIM: 182350; MGI: 88107; GeneCards: ATP1A3
Enzyme activity
EC #	BRENDA	ExPASy	KEGG	MetaCyc
7.2.2.13	↗	↗	↗	↗

Gene location (Human)
Chr.	Chromosome 19 (human)
Band	19q13.2	Start	41,966,582 bp
Band	19q13.2	End	41,997,497 bp

Gene location (Mouse)
Chr.	Chromosome 7 (mouse)
Band	7 A3|7 13.73 cM	Start	24,677,592 bp
Band	7 A3|7 13.73 cM	End	24,705,383 bp
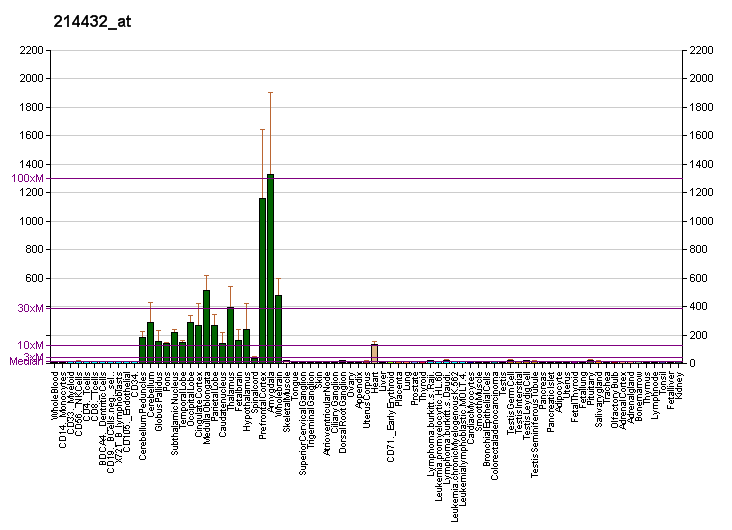
RNA expression pattern
Bgee	Human / Mouse (ortholog); Top expressed in: superior frontal gyrus; primary visual cortex; right hemisphere of cerebellum; prefrontal cortex; apex of heart; dorsolateral prefrontal cortex; right frontal lobe; Brodmann area 9; hypothalamus; anterior cingulate cortex / Top expressed in: primary visual cortex; dentate gyrus of hippocampal formation granule cell; neural layer of retina; superior frontal gyrus; subiculum; dorsomedial hypothalamic nucleus; pontine nuclei; cerebellar cortex; dorsal tegmental nucleus; habenula; More reference expression data
BioGPS	More reference expression data
Gene ontology
Molecular function	steroid hormone binding; nucleotide binding; chaperone binding; P-type sodium:potassium-exchanging transporter activity; metal ion binding; P-type sodium:potassium-exchanging transporter activity involved in regulation of cardiac muscle cell membrane potential; heparan sulfate proteoglycan binding; D1 dopamine receptor binding; hydrolase activity; ATP binding; amyloid-beta binding; P-type potassium transmembrane transporter activity; ion antiporter activity involved in regulation of presynaptic membrane potential
Cellular component	cytoplasm; integral component of membrane; dendritic spine neck; extracellular vesicle; Golgi apparatus; membrane; myelin sheath; plasma membrane; synapse; sodium:potassium-exchanging ATPase complex; axon; dendritic spine head; endoplasmic reticulum; sarcolemma; nucleus; neuronal cell body membrane; soma
Biological process	visual learning; cellular response to steroid hormone stimulus; regulation of cardiac conduction; cardiac muscle contraction; sodium ion transport; cellular sodium ion homeostasis; adult locomotory behavior; sodium ion export across plasma membrane; cell communication by electrical coupling involved in cardiac conduction; response to glycoside; ion transport; memory; cellular potassium ion homeostasis; potassium ion transport; ion transmembrane transport; ionotropic glutamate receptor signaling pathway; transport; regulation of cardiac muscle cell membrane potential; establishment or maintenance of transmembrane electrochemical gradient; cerebral cortex development; cellular response to retinoic acid; cellular response to thyroid hormone stimulus; regulation of resting membrane potential; regulation of presynaptic membrane potential; cellular response to amyloid-beta; neuron projection maintenance; potassium ion import across plasma membrane
Sources:Amigo / QuickGO
Orthologs
Databases	NCBI: entry; OMA: entry
Species	Human	Mouse
Entrez	478	232975
Ensembl	ENSG00000105409	ENSMUSG00000040907
UniProt	P13637	Q6PIC6
RefSeq (mRNA)	NM_001256213; NM_001256214; NM_152296	NM_001290469; NM_144921; NM_001374627
RefSeq (protein)	NP_001243142; NP_001243143; NP_689509	NP_001277398; NP_001361556
Location (UCSC)	Chr 19: 41.97 – 42 Mb	Chr 7: 24.68 – 24.71 Mb
PubMed search
- Wikidata
View/Edit Human	View/Edit Mouse

Sodium/potassium-transporting ATPase subunit alpha-3 is an enzyme that in humans is encoded by the ATP1A3 gene.

== Function ==
The protein encoded by this gene belongs to the family of P-type cation transport ATPases, and to the subfamily of Na^{+}/K^{+}-ATPases. Na^{+}/K^{+}-ATPase is an integral membrane protein responsible for establishing and maintaining the electrochemical gradients of Na and K ions across the plasma membrane. These gradients are essential for osmoregulation, for sodium-coupled transport of a variety of organic and inorganic molecules, and for electrical excitability of nerve and muscle. This enzyme is composed of two subunits, a large catalytic subunit (alpha) and a smaller glycoprotein subunit (beta). The catalytic subunit of Na^{+}/K^{+}-ATPase is encoded by multiple genes. This gene encodes an alpha 3 subunit. ATP1A3 is expressed early in human development, likely underlying pathophysiology related to several ATP1A3 related diseases.

== Clinical significance ==
Disease causing variants of the ATP1A3 gene are known to cause a variety of movement disorders and epilepsies. The known associations include a variety of syndromes, in approximate order of presentation:

1. Malformation of Cortex Development, including polymicrogyria;
2. Developmental and epileptic encephalopathy 99 (DEE99);
3. Alternating hemiplegia of childhood 2 (AHC2);
4. Cerebellar ataxia, Areflexia, Pes cavus, Optic atrophy and Sensorineural hearing loss (CAPOS/CAOS syndrome);
5. Very early-onset schizophrenia;
6. Rapid-onset dystonia parkinsonism (RDP, also known as DYT12);
7. Fever-induced paroxysmal weakness and encephalopathy (FIPWE);
8. Recurrent episodes of cerebellar ataxia (RECA).

In mice, mutations in this gene are associated with epilepsy. By manipulating this gene in the offspring of such mice, epilepsy can be avoided.
