= Cardiospondylocarpofacial syndrome =

Genetic disorder

- Other names: Forney syndrome, Forney-Robinson-Pascoe syndrome, Mitral regurgitation-deafness-skeletal anomalies syndrome, Mitral regurgitation-hearing loss-skeletal anomalies syndrome.
- Cardiospondylocarpofacial syndrome has an autosomal dominant form of inheritance.
- Symptoms: Vertebral anomalies, brachydactyly, conductive hearing loss, high palate, mitral regurgitation, mitral valve prolapse, short stature, short palms, and carpal bone synostosis.
- Causes: Autosomal dominant mutations of the MAP3K7 gene.
- Diagnostic method: Genetic testing.
- Frequency: Only 12 cases worldwide.

Cardiospondylocarpofacial syndrome is a very rare genetic disorder which is characterized by cardiac, digital, osseous anomalies with facial dysmorphisms. Cardiospondylocarpofacial syndrome is believed to be caused by autosomal dominant mutations of the MAP3K7 gene.

== Signs and symptoms ==
Cardiospondylocarpofacial syndrome manifests itself in many different areas of the body. It causes heart defects, multiple congenital anomalies, and dysmorphic features. The following is a list of the symptoms most commonly exhibited:

- Variable vertebral anomalies
- Brachydactyly
- Conductive hearing loss
- High palate
- Mitral regurgitation
- Mitral valve prolapse
- Short stature, nearing dwarfism
- Short palms
- Carpal bone synostosis

Less common symptoms include:

- Failure for permanent teeth to erupt
- Teeth misalignment
- Horseshoe kidney
- Dentition anomalies
- Ocular anomalies
- Nostril anteversion
- Epiphysis in the shape of a cone
- Decreased testes size (males)
- Skeletal maturation delay
- Feeding difficulties
- Freckles
- Apple cheeks
- Gastroesophageal reflux
- Hypertelorism
- Joint hypermobility
- Long philtrum
- Rotated ears
- Pseudoepiphyses
- High frequency of middle ear infections
- Rib synostosis
- Scoliosis
- Small foot
- Strabismus
- Tarsal synostosis
- Telecanthus
- Upslanted palpebral fissures
- Broad nasal bridge
- Vesicoureteral reflux

== Causes ==
It is caused by autosomal dominant mutations of the MAP3K7 gene in the long arm of chromosome 6.

== Epidemiology ==
Only 12 cases worldwide have been described in medical literature.
