= Pai syndrome =

- Other names: Median cleft of the upper lip-corpus callosum lipoma-midline facial cutaneous polyps syndrome
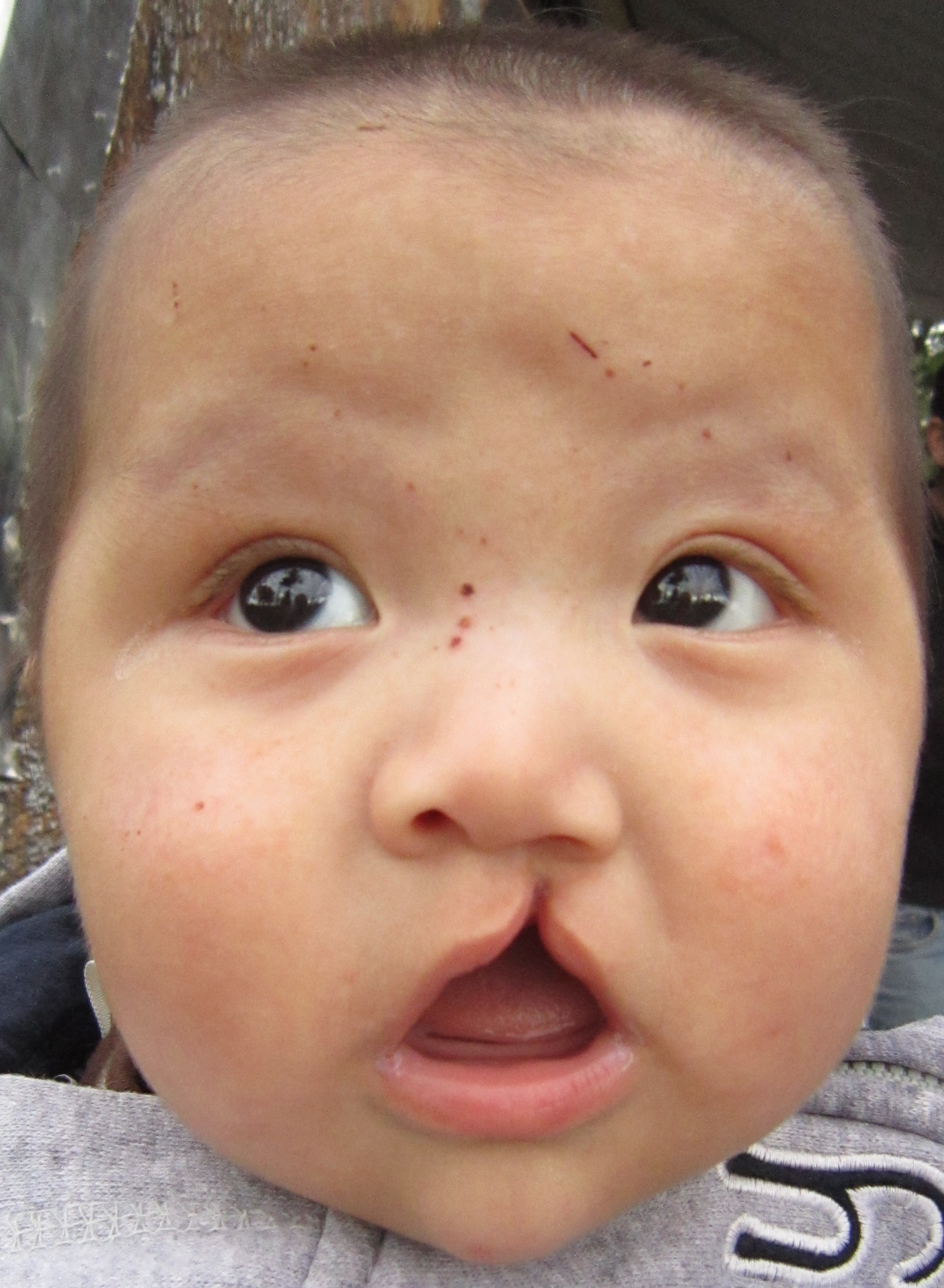
- Specialty: Medical genetics
- Causes: Genetic mutation
- Prevention: none
- Prognosis: Good
- Frequency: very rare, between 10-80 cases have been described in medical literature

Pai syndrome, also known as Median cleft of the upper lip-corpus callosum lipoma-midline facial cutaneous polyps syndrome, is a very rare genetic disorder which is characterized by nervous system, cutaneous, ocular, nasal and bucal anomalies with facial dysmorphisms.

== Signs and symptoms ==
List of common symptoms:

- Depressed nasal bridge
- Median cleft lip
- Central nervous system lipomas.
- Nasal polyposis
- Presence of skin tags
- Subcutaneous nodule

List of not-so-common symptoms:[2]

- Oral frenulum abnormalities
- Bifid uvula
- Hypertelorism
- Telecanthus

List of uncommon symptoms:[2]

- Missing/underdeveloped corpus callosum
- Down-slanting palpebral fissures
- Encephalocele
- Coloboma
- Nose defects
- Frontal bossing
- High palate

== Causes ==
A specific, shared genetic cause hasn't been found. The closest thing to it was a case reported by Masuno et al. of a Japanese girl with symptoms of the disorder plus short stature and intellectual disabilities with a spontaneous reciprocal translocation. This translocation involved chromosome Xq28 and chromosome 16q11.2 (more specifically, 46,X,t(X;16)(q28;q11.2).

== Epidemiology ==
According to OMIM, 18 cases have been described in medical literature, but according to ORPHAnet, 67 cases have been described.
