= Familial benign copper deficiency =

- Other names: Familial benign hypocupremia, Copper deficiency familial benign.
- Specialty: Medical genetics
- Symptoms: Skin and mild vascular abnormalities
- Usual onset: Infancy
- Duration: Lifelong (but symptoms improve when oral copper is supplemented
- Causes: X-linked dominant or Autosomal dominant genetic mutation.
- Diagnostic method: Blood testing, physical examination.
- Prevention: none
- Treatment: Oral supplements of copper.
- Medication: Oral supplements of copper
- Prognosis: Good
- Deaths: –

Familial benign copper deficiency, also known as Familial benign hypocupremia, is a rare genetic disorder which is characterized by hypocupremia that causes symptoms such as epilepsy, hypotonia, seborrheic skin, thriving failure and mild anemia. Radiological findings include tibia and femur spurring. Transmission is thought to be either autosomal dominant or X-linked dominant.

Symptoms are caused by a familial tendency of having low levels of copper within the body and can be improved (treated and managed) with oral supplements of copper.

It has been described in members of a 3-generation Hungarian family.
