= Crome syndrome =

- Other names: Cataract-nephropathy-encephalopathy syndrome
- Specialty: Neurology

Crome syndrome is a rare disease defined by various symptoms, including epilepsy, intellectual disability, and eye and kidney problems. It usually causes death in 4 to 8 months.

== History ==
In 1963, a doctor studied two female infants who showed symptoms of intellectual disability, congenital cataracts, epileptic seizures and small stature. The two girls died at the age of 4 and 8 months. The autopsy revealed renal tubular necrosis and encephalopathy.
