= Pascual-Castroviejo syndrome type 1 =

- Other names: Cerebrofaciothoracic dysplasia
- Autosomal recessive pattern is the inheritance manner of this condition.
- Causes: Mutations in the TMCO1 gene

Pascual-Castroviejo syndrome type 1 is a rare autosomal recessive condition characterized by facial dysmorphism, cognitive impairment and skeletal anomalies.

== Signs and symptoms ==
These can be divided into four areas

- Facial features
  - Brachycephaly
  - Low hairline
  - Narrow forehead
  - Bushy eyebrows
  - Synophrys
  - Hypertelorism
  - Ptosis
  - Broad nose
  - Wide philtrum
  - Triangular shaped mouth
  - Maxillary hypoplasia
  - Cleft lip and palate
  - Small conical teeth
  - Short neck
- Skeletal abnormalities
  - Abnormalities of the upper thoracic vertebrae and ribs
  - Hypermobility
  - Talipes (clubfoot)
- Central nervous system
  - Hypoplasia of the corpus callosum and cerebellar vermis
  - Cognitive impairment
  - Chiari I malformation
  - Optic nerve colobomas
  - Grey matter hypodensity
- Other
  - Hypothyroidism

== Genetics ==
This disease is caused by mutations in the transmembrane and coiled-coil domain-containing protein 1 (TMCO1) on the long arm of chromosome 1.

== Diagnosis ==
The diagnosis may be provisionally made on clinical grounds. Further diagnostic tests include serum and urine analysis for lactic acid, a chest X-ray (or cardiac CT or MRI) and echocardiography. Biopsies from cardiac and skeletal muscle will show the presence of lipid and glycogen. Testing for mitochondrial abnormalities including adenosine nucleotide transporter deficiency and decreases in the respiratory chain complexes I and IV can also be done.

=== Differential diagnosis ===
Coffin syndrome must also be considered due to the facial appearance, which includes a large forehead, hypertelorism, and some degree of micrognathia. Coffin syndrome patients have vertebral anomalies that contribute to kyphosis, but no rib deformities have been described, and facial dysmorphic traits are more evident. Similar dysmorphic traits have been described in Robinow syndrome, albeit many features, such as normal genitalia, mental impairment, and a lack of limb bone deformities, are discordant.

== Treatment ==
There is no known treatment for this condition. Surgery may be helpful in treating the cleft lip and palate.

== Prognosis ==
All cases to date have been reported in children. Long term prognosis is not known.

== Epidemiology ==
Pascual-Castroviejo syndrome type 1 is rare. About 20 cases have been reported worldwide.

== History ==
This condition was first described in 1975.
