= Cyprus facial neuromusculoskeletal syndrome =

- Other names: Unusual facial appearance, skeletal deformities, and musculoskeletal and sensory defects.
- Specialty: Medical genetics
- Complications: Neurologic and muscular symptoms can be debilitating at times
- Usual onset: Birth
- Duration: Lifelong
- Deaths: -

Cyprus facial neuromusculoskeletal syndrome is a very rare autosomal dominant genetic disorder affecting only one three-generation Greek Cypriot family. Disorder often characterized by a "mephistophelian" appearance consisting of a ridged, thick triangular skin fold extending from the glabella up into the anterior fontanel, alongside other symptoms such as hypertelorism, widow's peak, low-set ears, kyphoscoliosis congenita, congenital clubfoot, hip dislocation, and arthrogryposis. Additional findings include cataracts, decreased articular range of motion, ptosis, and ankylosis, and, less commonly, mild sensory deficits with muscle weakness and atrophy.
