= Camptodactyly-taurinuria syndrome =

Camptodactyly-taurinaria syndrome
- Other names: Familial streblodactyly with amino aciduria
- Specialty: Medical genetics
- Symptoms: permanent flexion of the fingers of the hand (camptodactyly, and high levels of taurine in urine
- Usual onset: Infancy
- Duration: life-long
- Causes: Genetic mutation
- Prevention: none
- Prognosis: good
- Frequency: very rare, less than 20 cases reported worldwide

Camptodactyly-taurinuria syndrome, also known as familial streblodactyly with amino aciduria, is a very rare autosomal dominant genetic disorder which consists of hand camptodactyly (usually affecting the pinky finger) and high levels of taurine in urine due to over-excretion of it. 17 affected people from 4 families across the world have been reported in medical literature. No new cases have been described since 1966. It is believed to be autosomal dominant.
