= Ramos-Arroyo syndrome =

- Other names: Corneal anesthesia-deafness-intellectual disability syndrome
- Ramos-Arroyo syndrome is inherited in an autosomal dominant manner.

Ramos-Arroyo syndrome is marked by corneal anesthesia, absence of the peripapillary choriocapillaris and retinal pigment epithelium, bilateral sensorineural hearing loss, unusual facial appearance, persistent ductus arteriosus, Hirschsprung disease, and moderate intellectual disability. It appears to be a distinct autosomal dominant syndrome with variable expressivity.

As of 2008 this syndrome has only been reported in five individuals within three generations of the same family; two young children, their mother, their uncle and their maternal grandmother. This most recent generation to be diagnosed with Ramos-Arroyo syndrome supports the hypothesis that this disease is a distinct autosomal dominant disorder. If this syndrome could be identified in other families it may help to discriminate the gene responsible.
