= Cortes Lacassie syndrome =

Medical condition

Cortes Lacassie syndrome is a rare disease that is characterized by seizures, abnormalities in nails, hair and teeth, and malformed hands and feet. It is named after Fanny Cortes and Yves Lacassie, two researchers from the University of Chile who discovered the disease in 1986. Cortes Lacassie syndrome is considered a rare disease and has only been recorded in one case, leading to death at 31 months.

== Symptoms ==
This disease is characterized by agenesis of fingers and toes, and hypotrophy of fingernails at birth. At 3 months, the baby exhibited delayed psychomotor development and developed myoclonic seizures. Chromosomal study indicated no abnormalities. The baby developed acute epileptic seizures, acute renal failure, and hepatorenal syndrome, dying at 31 months.

=== Related Diseases ===
Cortes Lacassie syndrome is a form of ectodermal dysplasia, postulated to be a new type of the group of tricho-odonto-onychic disorders.
