= Camera–Marugo–Cohen syndrome =

Genetic disorder of obesity, mental disability, body asymmetry, and muscular weakness

- Other names: Obesity, mental retardation, body asymmetry and muscle weakness syndrome
- Specialty: Medical genetics
- Symptoms: Obesity, intellectual disabilities, widespread body asymmetry and generalized muscle weakness
- Usual onset: Post-natal
- Duration: Life-long
- Diagnostic method: Physical evaluation
- Prevention: none
- Prognosis: Good
- Frequency: 2 unrelated cases have been reported in medical literature
- Deaths: -

Camera–Marugo–Cohen syndrome, also known as obesity, intellectual disability, body asymmetry and muscle weakness syndrome is a very rare genetic disorder which is characterized by familial obesity, intellectual disabilities, body asymmetry, and muscular weakness. It is a type of syndromic obesity, or obesity syndrome. Two cases have been reported in medical literature (there were three, but one of the patients was found to have diploid mixoploidy.)

== Etiology ==
This disorder was discovered in 1993 by Camera et al., when they described a patient with short stature, intellectual disability, hypogonadism, micropenis, camptodactyly, and cleft lip/palate. They came to the conclusion that this was a novel post-natal obesity syndrome.

A second case report was published by Lambert et al. in 1999, whey described 2 un-related patients with generalized obesity, "mental retardation", body asymmetry, muscle weakness, retrognathia, blepharoptosis, hyperlordosis, deviation of the hallux, syndactyly, and camptodactyly.

A comment left in 2001 on the case report described by Lambert et al. (made by no other than Lambert et al. themselves) updated the two patient case report: one of the patients were found to have diploid/triploid mixoploidy, the second patient and the patient described by Camera et al. were unavailable for karyotyping.
