= Combarros–Calleja–Leno syndrome =

- Other names: Freidreich's ataxia and congenital glaucoma
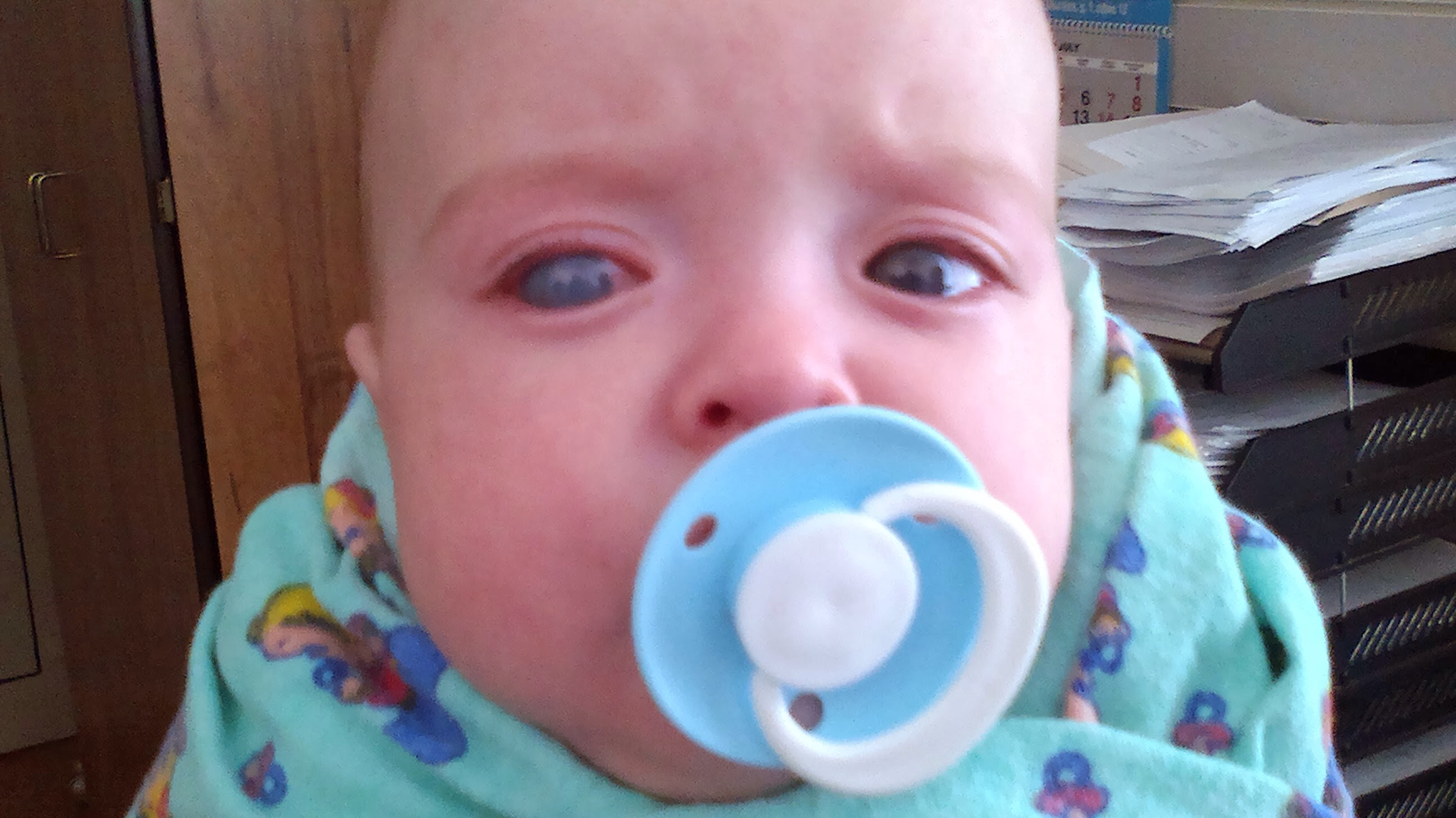
- Specialty: Medical genetics
- Causes: Suspected pleiotropy
- Prognosis: Medium
- Frequency: very rare, only 7 cases from a consanguineous Spanish family have been reported
- Deaths: -

Combarros–Calleja–Leno syndrome is a very rare genetic disorder which is characterized by a combination of ataxia indistinguishable from Friedreich's ataxia and congenital glaucoma. Additional findings include pes cavus and generalized areflexia. It has been described in 7 members from a consanguineous Spanish family.

== See also ==
- Congenital glaucoma
- Friedreich's ataxia
