= Cat eye syndrome =

Genetic partial duplication of chromosome 22

- Other names: CES
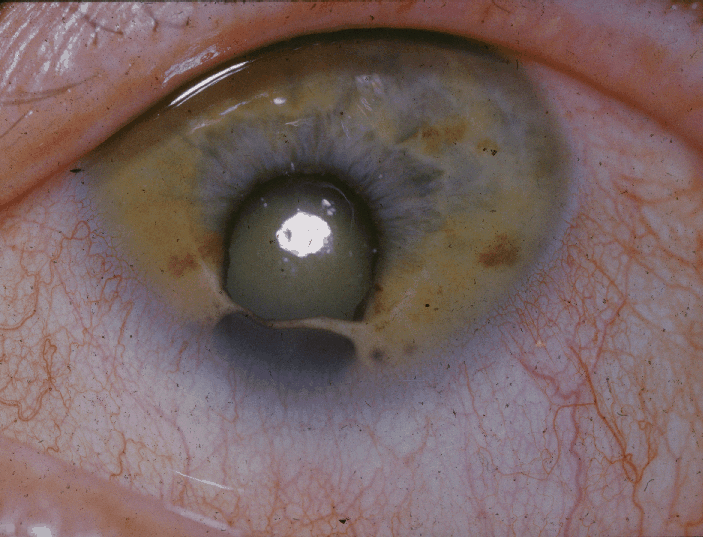
- An example of the defect after which CES is named
- Specialty: Medical genetics
- Differential diagnosis: CHARGE syndrome
- Frequency: 1 in 74,000

Cat eye syndrome (CES) or Schmid–Fraccaro syndrome is a rare condition caused by an abnormal extra chromosome, i.e. a small supernumerary marker chromosome. This chromosome consists of the entire short arm and a small section of the long arm of chromosome 22. In consequence, individuals with the cat-eye syndrome have three (trisomic) or four (tetrasomic) copies of the genetic material contained in the abnormal chromosome instead of the normal two copies. The prognosis for patients with CES varies depending on the severity of the condition and their associated signs and symptoms, especially when heart or kidney abnormalities are seen.

== Signs and symptoms ==
- Unilateral or bilateral iris coloboma (absence of tissue from the colored part of the eyes)
- Preauricular pits/tags (small depressions/growths of skin on the outer ears)

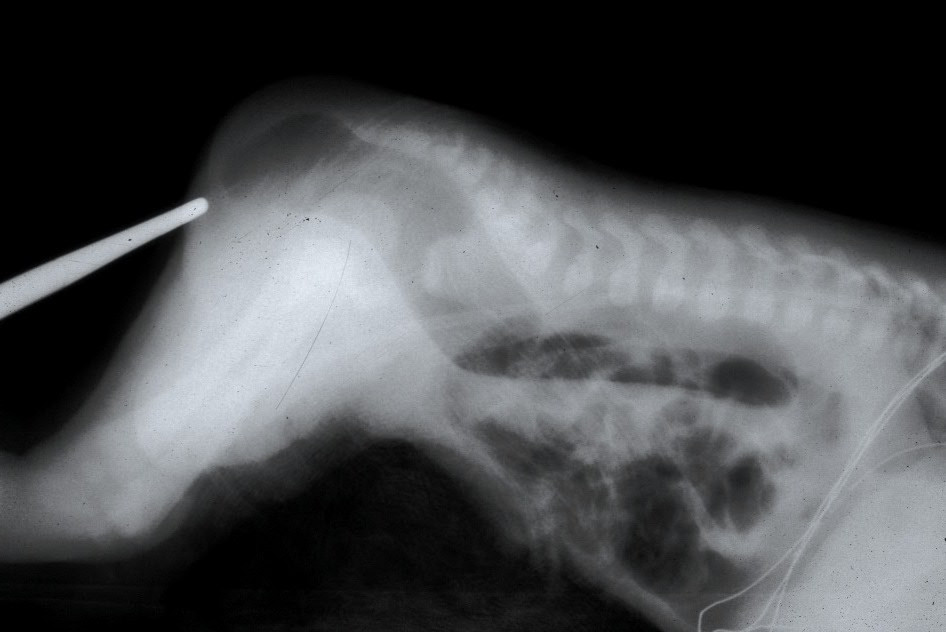
X-ray image of anal atresia in human infant

- Anal atresia (abnormal obstruction of the anus)
- Downward-slanting palpebral fissures (openings between the upper and lower eyelids)
- Cleft palate
- Kidney problems (missing, extra, or underdeveloped kidneys)
- Short stature
- Scoliosis/skeletal problems
- Cardiac defects (such as TAPVR)
- Micrognathia (smaller jaw)
- Hernias
- Biliary atresia
- Rarer malformations can affect almost any organ
- Intellectual disability – many are intellectually normal; about 30% of CES patients have moderately impaired mental development, although severe intellectual disability is rare.

The term "cat eye" syndrome was coined because of the particular appearance of the vertical colobomas in the eyes of some patients, but over half of the CES patients in the literature do not present with this trait.

== Genetics ==
The small supernumerary marker chromosome (sSMC) in CES usually arises spontaneously. It may be hereditary and parents may be mosaic for the marker chromosome, but show no phenotypic symptoms of the syndrome. This sSMC may be small, large, or ring-shaped, and typically includes 2 Mb, i.e. 2 million DNA base pairs, termed the CES critical region, located on its q arm(s) between its band 11 and terminus (area notated as 22pter→q11)(also see small supernumerary marker chromosomes in cat eye syndrome). This area contains the CECR1, SLC25A18, and ATP6V1E1 genes which are strong candidate genes for causing or promoting at least some of the birth defects in CES.

== Diagnosis ==
An ultrasound exam may be used by a doctor to detect a birth defect that might be CES before a baby is born. An ultrasound creates an image of the fetus using sound waves. It might uncover specific CES-specific flaws. A follow-up test, like an amniocentesis, may be ordered by the doctor if they see these characteristics on an ultrasound. The doctor collects an amniotic fluid sample for analysis during amniocentesis. Extra chromosomal material from chromosome 22q11 helps doctors identify CES. The diagnosis can be verified through genetic testing. These tests could consist of:

- Karyotyping. A picture of a person's chromosomes is generated by this test.
- FISH, or fluorescence in situ hybridization. It is able to identify and pinpoint a particular DNA sequence on a chromosome.

The healthcare provider will likely order more testing when CES is identified to look for any potential extra problems, like heart or kidney disorders. These tests may include:

- X-rays and other imaging tests
- electrocardiography (EKG)
- echocardiography
- eye examination
- hearing tests
- cognitive function tests

== History ==
The abnormalities common to CES were first cataloged in 1899, and described in association with a small marker chromosome in 1965. Early reports of CES discuss the possibility of chromosome 13 involvement. Now, CES is considered to be present with the chromosome 22 trisomy findings.

== See also ==
- Trisomy 22
