= Ho–Kaufman–McAlister syndrome =

- Other names: Chen-Kung Ho–Kaufman–McAlister syndrome

Ho–Kaufman–McAlister syndrome is a rare congenital malformation syndrome where infants are born with a cleft palate, micrognathia, Wormian bones, congenital heart disease, dislocated hips, bowed fibulae, preaxial polydactyly of the feet, abnormal skin patterns, and most prominently, missing tibia. The etiology is unknown. Ho–Kaufman–McAlister syndrome is named after Chen-Kung Ho, R.L. Kaufman, and W.H. McAlister who first described the syndrome in 1975 at Washington University in St. Louis. It is considered a rare disease by the Office of Rare Diseases (ORD) of the National Institutes of Health (NIH).
