= CAPOS syndrome =

- Other names: CAPOS CAPOS syndrome. Cerebellar ataxia-areflexia-pes cavus-optic atrophy-sensorineural hearing loss syndrome. Cerebellar ataxia - areflexia - pes cavus - optic atrophy - sensorineural hearing loss.
- Specialty: Medical genetics, Ophthalmology, Neurology, Podology
- Symptoms: Mainly cerebellar ataxia, sensorineural hearing loss, and optic nerve atrophy
- Complications: Blindness, deafness, problems with coordination.
- Usual onset: During a fever
- Duration: Lifelong
- Types: It is a type of ATP1A3-related disorder
- Causes: Genetic mutation
- Prevention: None
- Treatment: Symptom-centred
- Prognosis: Medium (with treatment), bad (without treatment
- Frequency: rare, only 14 cases have been described in medical literature
- Deaths: -

CAPOS syndrome is a rare genetic neurological disorder which is characterized by abnormalities of the feet, eyes and brain which affect their normal function. These symptoms occur episodically when a fever-related infection is present within the body. The name is an acronym for "cerebellar ataxia, areflexia, pes cavus, optic atrophy, and sensorineural hearing loss".

== Signs and symptoms ==
Usually, individuals with this condition have cerebellar ataxia, areflexia, high-arched feet, optic nerve wasting/degeneration, sensorineural deafness.

These symptoms have variable onset, but they generally begin episodically after having a fever-causing infection such as the common cold, manifesting mainly as sudden-onset ataxic episodes and encephalopathy. Other triggers include pregnancy and giving birth. Other symptoms that occur during the episodic ataxia includes hypotonia, nystagmus, strabismus, dysarthria, dysphagia, areflexia/hyporeflexia, and temporary deafness. More serious symptoms include loss of consciousness and/or onset of a coma.

These symptoms usually improve alongside the illness that caused the fever.

General frequency of episodes with people suffering from CAPOS syndrome is 1–3.

== Complications ==
There are various complications associated with the disorder, some of them include vision impairment/blindness due to optic atrophy characteristic of the disorder, deafness due to atrophy of the nerves that aid in hearing, problems with walking due to the ataxia, etc.

== Causes ==
This condition is caused by autosomal dominant missense mutations in the ATP1A3 gene, in chromosome 19. The mutation is thought to be gain-of-function.

== Epidemiology ==
According to OMIM, only 14 cases have been described in medical literature.

== History ==
This condition was first discovered in 1996 by Nicolaides et al. when they described a mother and two siblings (brother and sister) with (summarized) early-onset reoccurring cerebellar ataxia and progressive optic atrophy accompanied by sensorineural deafness.
