= Calvarial doughnut lesions-bone fragility syndrome =

Genetic disorder of fragile bones and lesions atop the skull

- X-ray of the skull of three familial CDL patients showing the multiple cranial lesions characteristic of this condition. All of these patients carried a c.148C>T (p.Arg50*) mutation in the SGMS2 gene.
- Specialty: Medical genetics
- Causes: Genetic mutation
- Prevention: none
- Frequency: 0.0001%

Calvarial doughnut lesions-bone fragility syndrome, also known as familial calvarial doughnut lesions, is a rare autosomal dominant genetic disorder characterized by mild to moderate fragility of the bones accompanied with calvarial doughnut lesions.

== Signs and symptoms ==
This condition consists of the presence of multiple lesions in bones of the cranium that resemble the shape of a doughnut, fragile bones that fracture easily starting from early childhood, and a lowered bone mineral density.

Other features of this condition include dental caries, teeth hypoplasia, and an increased level of serum alkaline phosphatase levels. Glaucoma is occasionally reported among patients.

Individuals with severe cases of the condition show other symptoms such as cranial sclerosis, spondylometaphyseal dysplasia, very short stature, and a more early onset of bone fragility with recurrent bone fractures starting during the neonatal stage of life.

== Genetics ==
This condition is caused by a mutation in the SGMS2 gene, located on the long arm of the 4th chromosome. The mutations result in the production of a SGMS2 enzyme that has no function at all.

Said mutation has an autosomal dominant mode of inheritance, which means that for a person to exhibit the disorder associated with the mutation, they need to have at least one copy of the mutation in one of their two SGMS2 genes, this mutation had to be inherited or it had to be the result of a spontaneous genetic error.

In rare cases, this disorder can be caused by a mutation (which is also autosomal dominant) in the IFITM5 gene. This mutation (c.143A>G (p.N48S)) has only been described in a single Japanese family with the condition.

== Diagnosis ==
Diagnostic methods for familial doughnut calvarial lesions include the use of MRI technology, X-rays, bone biopsies, and next-generation genetic testing.

D Baumgartner et al. found abnormalities of the skull through MRIs and X-rays on a 16-year-old teenager with a sporadic case of the condition.

Jaakkola et al. found skeletal anomalies in 3 generations of a single Finnish family through X-rays and bone biopsies, their findings included a compression fracture at spinal vertebrae T12, an abnormal, thin cortical bone and trabeculae, high osteoclast activity, and abnormal diffuse thickening of the skull.

Pekkiken et al. found scoliosis and platyspondyly in a Dutch woman, her son, and a Hispanic boy through X-rays.

== Prevalence ==
As of 2009, there had been less than 50 cases of this condition in the medical literature.

== History ==
This condition was first described in 1976 by Bartlett et al. Their patients were a man and his 3 sons who had calvarial lesions in their skulls and frequent bone fractures resulting from bone fragility. All of the three sons were born from different biological mothers, and although the latter detail, combined with the fact that they all shared a common biological father with the disorder, was indicative of autosomal dominant inheritance, the researchers leading the study erroneously came to the conclusion that the disorder was inherited as a form of sex-linked trait. The man also had 4 other children which weren't affected with the condition.

Pekkinen et al. discovered the causative gene and mutations for the disorder in the year 2019 in 6 families from Finland, the United States, the Netherlands, and Latin America. Three mutations were identified; two missense mutations (c.191T>G and c.185T>G) which occurred in 2 families, and a nonsense mutation (c.148C>T) in the other 4 families.

== Genotype-phenotype correlation with symptoms ==
In a 2019 study, Pekkinen et al. did next-generation sequencing on a subset of 13 patients from 6 families with various ethnic origins and found 3 different mutations in all of the patients, 2 in particular were predicted to cause severe symptoms, while the other 1 (shared by the other four families) was predicted to cause a milder phenotype.

The mutations were as follows:

- c.148C>T (p.Arg50*)
- c.185T>G (p. Ile62Ser)
- c.191T>G (p.Met64Arg)

Individuals from the first four families with the c.148C>T variant showed mild symptoms of the condition, which included cranial sclerosis and childhood onset bone fragility, while individuals with the c.185T>G or the c.191T>G variant showed bone fragility and fractures starting during neonatal years, spondylometaphyseal dysplasia, abnormally short stature, recurrent paresis affecting the peripheral facial nerve, and other neurological anomalies.

== See also ==
- Osteoporosis-pseudoglioma syndrome, genetic disorder which combines the association of osteoporosis and pseudoglioma.
- Osteogenesis imperfecta, also known as brittle bone disease, it is a similar type of genetic bone disease characterized by congenital bone fragility.
