= Graham–Boyle–Troxell syndrome =

Graham-Boyle-Troxell syndrome
- Specialty: Pediatry
- Causes: Unknown, although it is a congenital condition

Graham-Boyle-Troxell syndrome, also known as Cystic hamartoma of the lung and kidney, is an extremely rare congenital malformation which is characterized by benign hamartomatous cysts present in the lung and kidney. Symptoms include respiratory insufficiency, recurrent respiratory infections, and hypertension. Additional radiological features include hyperplastic nephromegaly, dysplastic medulla, and mesoblastic nephroma. Only three cases have been described in medical literature.

Its inheritance pattern is not known.
