= Chromhidrosis =

- Other names: Colored sweat
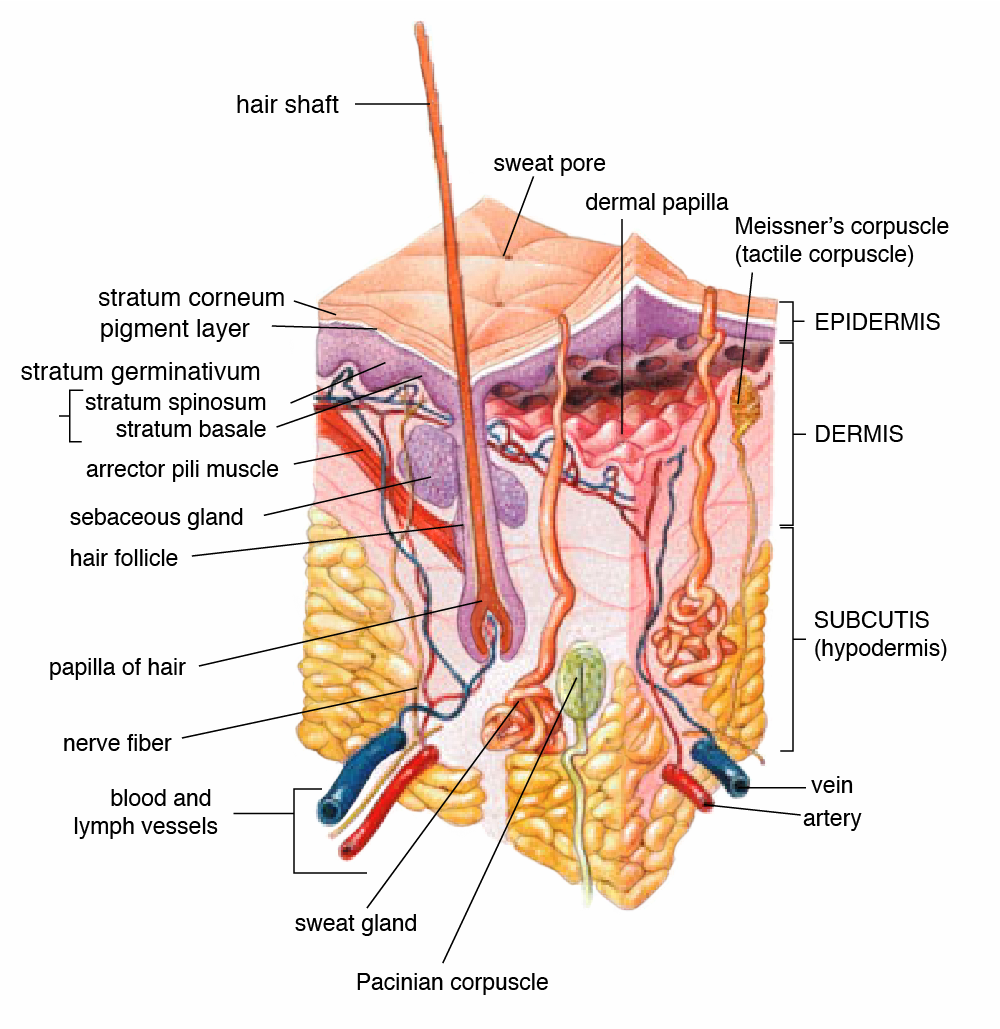
- Specialty: Dermatology

Chromhidrosis is a rare condition characterized by the secretion of colored sweat. It is caused by the deposition of lipofuscin in the sweat glands. Cases of red, blue, green, yellow, pink, and black sweat have been reported.

Usually, chromhidrosis affects the apocrine glands, mainly on the face and underarms. A limited number of treatment options exist, including regular application of capsaicin cream, and prolonged relief may be provided by botulinum toxin treatment. Chromogenic pigments produced by bacteria (Corynebacterium in particular) are implicated in this condition, but their exact role still requires careful microbiological elucidation.

Chromhidrosis of the eccrine glands is rare; it occurs mainly after the ingestion of certain dyes or drugs.

== See also ==
- List of cutaneous conditions
