= Cold antibody hemolytic anemia =

Cold antibody hemolytic anemia may refer to:

- Cold agglutinin disease
- Paroxysmal cold hemoglobinuria
