= Iridocorneal endothelial syndrome =

- Specialty: Ophthalmology

Iridocorneal endothelial (ICE) syndromes are a spectrum of diseases characterized by slowly progressive abnormalities of the corneal endothelium and features including corneal edema, iris distortion, and secondary angle-closure glaucoma. ICE syndromes are predominantly unilateral and nonhereditary. The condition occurs in predominantly middle-aged women. Iridocorneal Endothelial (ICE) syndrome presents a unique set of challenges for both patients and ophthalmologists, and effective treatment of this group of rare ocular diseases requires a combination of diagnostic and therapeutic complexity.

== Signs and symptoms ==
Many cases are asymptomatic, however patients many have decreased vision, glare, monocular diplopia or polyopia, and noticeable iris changes. On exam patients have normal to decreased visual acuity, and a "beaten metal appearance" of the corneal endothelium, corneal edema, increased intraocular pressure, peripheral anterior synechiae, and iris changes.

== Mechanism ==
The exact mechanism is unknown, however there appears to be a component of abnormal corneal endothelium that proliferates onto the iris forming a membrane that then obstructs the trabecular meshwork, leading to iris distortion. Nodule formation can also occur when the abnormal corneal endothelium causes contractions around the iris stroma. Herpesvirus DNA has been identified in some patients following keratoplasty, suggesting the possibility that herpes simplex virus may induce the abnormal endothelialization in the anterior chamber angle and on the surface of the iris.

=== Variations ===
The Chandler variant of ICE is characterized by pathology on the inner surface of the cornea leading to abnormal endothelial pump function. Other features include possible mild iris changes, corneal edema, and normal to slight elevations in intraocular pressure. Cogan-Reese variant is characterized by multiple pigmented iris nodules. This variant is most commonly unilateral and seen in middle-aged females.

== Treatment ==
Penetrating keratoplasty and endothelial keratoplasty can be used as treatments for severe cases of ICE. Because glaucoma and elevated intraocular pressure are often present in ICE patients, long term follow up may be needed to ensure adequate intraocular pressures are maintained.

== Prognosis ==
The disease is chronic and often progresses slowly. Prognosis is generally poor when associated with glaucoma.
