= Conradi–Hünermann syndrome =

Rare X-linked form of chondrodysplasia punctata

- Other names: "Conradi–Hünermann–Happle syndrome", "Happle syndrome," and "X-linked dominant chondrodysplasia punctata"
- Specialty: Medical genetics

Conradi–Hünermann syndrome is a rare type of chondrodysplasia punctata. It is associated with the EBP gene and affects between one in 100,000 and one in 200,000 babies.

== Signs and symptoms ==
Possible signs and symptoms may include

- Growth deficiency
- Low nasal bridge
- Flat face
- Down-slanting space between eyelids
- Cataracts
- Asymmetric limb shortness
- Joint shortening or spasms
- Frequent scoliosis
- Frequent kyphosis
- Abnormal redness of the skin
- Thick scales on infant skin
- Large skin pores
- Flaky skin
- Sparse hair
- Coarse hair
- Bald spots/alopecia
- Ichthyosis

== Genetics ==
Conradi–Hünermann syndrome is a form of chondrodysplasia punctata, a group of rare genetic disorders of skeletal development involving abnormal accumulations of calcium salts within the growing ends of long bones. Conradi–Hünermann syndrome is commonly associated with mild to moderate growth deficiency, disproportionate shortening of long bones, particularly those of the upper arms and the thigh bones, short stature, and/or curvature of the spine. In rare cases, intellectual disability may also be present. While evidence suggests that Conradi–Hünermann syndrome predominantly occurs in females and is usually inherited as an X-linked dominant trait, rare cases in which males were affected have also been reported.

The genetics of Conradi–Hünermann syndrome have perplexed medical geneticists, pediatricians and dermatologists for some time, but a number of perplexing features of the genetics of the syndrome have now been resolved, including the fact that the disease is caused by mutations in a gene, and these mutations are simple substitutions, deletions or insertions and are therefore not "unstable". Scientists are still trying to understand exactly where the mutation occurs so that they can correct it.

== Diagnosis ==
An important test to confirm a diagnosis of Conradi–Hünermann syndrome is evaluating the plasma for elevated levels of a substance known as sterols. Mutations of the EBP gene result in the accumulation of sterols in the plasma and certain tissues of the body. Sterol levels are measured by gas chromatography-mass spectrometry.

== Screening ==
Genetic screening for Conradi–Hünermann syndrome via the EBP Gene is offered by multiple providers.

== Treatment ==
Treatment can involve operations to lengthen the leg bones, which involves many visits to the hospital. Other symptoms can be treated with medicine or surgery. Most female patients with the syndrome can live a long and normal life, while males have only survived in rare cases, with most dying before birth.

== History ==
It is also known as Happle's syndrome, after the German Physician, Rudolf Happle (b. 1938), who wrote a series of papers about the disease in 1976. The name Conradi–Hünermann Syndrome is named for Erich Conradi (1882–1968), and Carl (Karl) Hünermann (1904–1978), both are German Physicians.

== See also ==
- Chondrodysplasia punctata
- Fetal warfarin syndrome
- List of cutaneous conditions
- List of radiographic findings associated with cutaneous conditions
