= Collins–Pope syndrome =

- Other names: Dislocation of the hip-dysmorphism syndrome
- Specialty: Medical genetics
- Symptoms: Congenital dislocation of the hip with facial dysmorphisms and joint hypermobility as the main characteristic of the syndrome.
- Usual onset: Birth
- Duration: Lifelong
- Causes: Genetic mutation
- Prevention: none
- Prognosis: Good
- Deaths: -

Collins–Pope syndrome, also known as Dislocation of the hip-dysmorphism syndrome, is a rare autosomal dominant genetic disorder which is characterized by bilateral congenital hip dislocation, flattened mid-face, hypertelorism, epicanthus, puffy eyes, broad nasal bridge, carp-shaped mouth, and joint hypermobility. Additional findings include congenital heart defects, congenital knee dislocation, congenital inguinal hernia, and vesicoureteric reflux. It has been described in 4 members of a 2-generation family in the United Kingdom.
