= Lubani Al Saleh Teebi syndrome =

- Other names: Cystic fibrosis, Helicobacter pylori gastritis, megaloblastic anemia, subnormal mentality and minor anomalies, Cystic fibrosis gastritis megaloblastic anemia
- Specialty: Medical genetics
- Causes: Genetic mutation
- Prevention: none
- Frequency: very rare

Lubani Al Saleh Teebi syndrome also known as cystic fibrosis-gastritis-megaloblastic anemia syndrome is a very rare autosomal recessive genetic disorder which consists of cystic fibrosis, helicobacter pylori-associated gastritis, folate-deficiency megaloblastic anemia and intellectual disabilities. This disorder was discovered when Lubani et al reported two siblings from consanguineous parents with the symptoms mentioned above in 1991. Since then, there have been no further reports of this syndrome in medical literature.
