= Monosomy 9p =

- Other names: 9p deletion syndrome
- Specialty: Medical genetics
- Differential diagnosis: Down syndrome

Monosomy 9p (also known as Alfi's Syndrome, 9p Minus or simply 9P-) is a rare chromosomal disorder in which some DNA is missing or has been deleted on the short arm region, "p", of one copy of chromosome 9 (9p22.2-p23). This deletion either happens de novo or as a result of a parent having the chromosome abnormality. This rare chromosomal abnormality is often diagnosed after birth when developmental delay, irregular facial features, structural irregularities within the heart, and genital defects are observed. Treatments for this syndrome usually focus on fixing the malformations that are commonly associated with it. The cause of the syndrome was first discovered by Dr. Omar Alfi in 1973, when an analysis of the chromosomes of three infants with similar clinical abnormalities revealed that they all had a partial deletion of the short arm of Chromosome 9. Symptoms include micro genitalia, intellectual disability with microcephaly and dysmorphic features.

== Signs and symptoms ==
=== Psychomotor development delays ===
Psychomotor developmental delays are delays in the emergence of the psychomotor skills that naturally develop from birth through adolescence, including cognitive, emotional, motor, language, and social skills. The severity of these delays can vary.

=== Craniofacial dysmorphism ===
- Down syndrome-like facial phenotype
- Trigonocephaly (Early closure of metopic suture.)
- Retruded midface
- Micrognathia (Small jaw)
- Low-set ears
- Hypertelorism (Wide-set eyes)
- Flat nasal bridge
- Microstomia (Narrow mouth opening)

=== Malformation of limbs ===
Congenital limb defects are the result of altered development of a fetus's upper or lower limb, including absence of the limb, a failure of portions of the limb (commonly fingers and toes) to separate, duplication of digits, overgrowth, or undergrowth.

== Genetics ==
=== Inheritance pattern ===
The inheritance pattern for monosomy 9p is inherited in an autosomal dominant inheritance pattern. This means that a single copy of the deletion is sufficient to cause the disease.

=== Mutation ===
The mutation, which occurs in the form of a deletion of the short arm of chromosome 9, causes the cell to not express the gene products normally controlled by the genes within the chromosome 9 deletion.

=== Genes involved ===
The 9p deletion causes a loss of genes that would normally be there. The signs, symptoms and severity of the condition depend on the specific genes that are lost. Most of the genes involved are associated with the development of tissues.

There are many possible genes that can be deleted, but two particular genes, DMRT1 and DMRT2, are known to be involved. When DMRT1 and DMRT2 are deleted, genital malformations and mental retardation are evident, but the direct mechanisms for these problems remain undefined.

=== Location ===
Geneticists originally had the syndrome narrowed down to the short arm region of chromosome 9. Now, the location of the deletion has recently been narrowed to 9p22.2-p23.

== Diagnosis ==
Diagnoses can occur at any age. Most of the time chromosome 9p deletion syndrome is diagnosed after birth by the detection of symptoms via clinical evaluation. Common methods used to detect monosomy 9p after birth include the use of a stethoscope, X-ray, and EKG. Monosomy 9p is also diagnosed before birth by ultrasound, amniocentesis, and chorionic villus sampling (CVS). Ultrasound can hint at the malformations of the face, limbs, and heart, while amniocentesis and CVS both use fluid and tissue to perform chromosomal studies to identify chromosomal abnormalities. Finally, karyotyping, a procedure used to examine a patient's chromosomes, can be used to diagnose monosomy 9p both before birth and after birth.

== Management ==
Treatment of monosomy 9p focuses mainly on fixing the malformations. For example, to fix facial malformations, physicians can perform facial surgery to repair the facial malformations. This can open airways for the infant or patient, especially the nose-to-throat pathway. Similarly, to fix heart malformations, physicians can recommend surgery or medication to improve the efficiency of the pumping of the heart. Lastly remedial education, speech therapy, and physical therapy can be used to improve the developmental delay associated with the syndrome.

== Epidemiology ==
Monosomy 9p occurs 1 in 50,000 births. Half of the cases occur sporadically, while the other half of the cases result from parent translocations or the parent having deletion as well.
