= Cousin–Walbraum–Cegarra syndrome =

Cousin-Walbraum-Cegarra syndrome
- Specialty: Medical genetics
- Symptoms: Facial dysmorphia, congenital dwarfism, hip dysplasia
- Usual onset: congenital
- Causes: Genetic mutation
- Diagnostic method: DNA sequencing
- Frequency: Very rare, only ten cases have been reported in medical literature

Cousin–Walbraum–Cegarra syndrome is a rare genetic and congenital disorder which consists of facial dysmorphia, congenital dwarfism, pelvic and scapular dysplasia, and growth plate abnormalities. In March 1982, medical literature described the case of a North African sister and brother from healthy consanguineous parents (first cousins in this case), both having the same symptoms, it was suggested that this disorder was inherited in an autosomal recessive fashion. Since then, only 10 cases have been reported in medical literature.
