= Cardiocranial syndrome, Pfeiffer type =

- Other names: Cardiocranial syndrome Craniostenosis, sagittal, with congenital heart disease, mental deficiency, and mandibular ankylosis Pfeiffer Singer Zschiesche syndrome

Cardiocranial syndrome, Pfeiffer type is a rare multiple disorder syndrome characterized by congenital heart defects, sagittal craniosynostosis, and severe developmental delay. The condition has been reported in less than 10 patients worldwide.

== Signs and symptoms ==
Features of this condition include:

- Abnormal heart morphology
- Abnormality of cardiovascular system morphology
- Aplasia uvulae
- Cleft palate
- Cryptorchidism
- Hypertelorism
- Low-set, dysplastic ears
- Micropenis
- Micrognathia (or retrognathia)
- Sagittal craniosynostosis
- Strabismus
- Trismus
- Intellectual disability
- Abnormal tracheobronchial morphology
- Growth delay

Symptoms also reported include large joint contractures, syndactyly, rib anomalies and hypoplastic kidneys; a few cases did not show cardiac anomalies.

== Causes ==
The condition is genetic but its origins are unclear. The condition has been seen in brother-sister sibling pairs, suggesting autosomal recessive inheritance, however autosomal dominant inheritance and submicroscopic deletions (not inherited) have been suggested.
