= Cataract-ataxia-deafness syndrome =

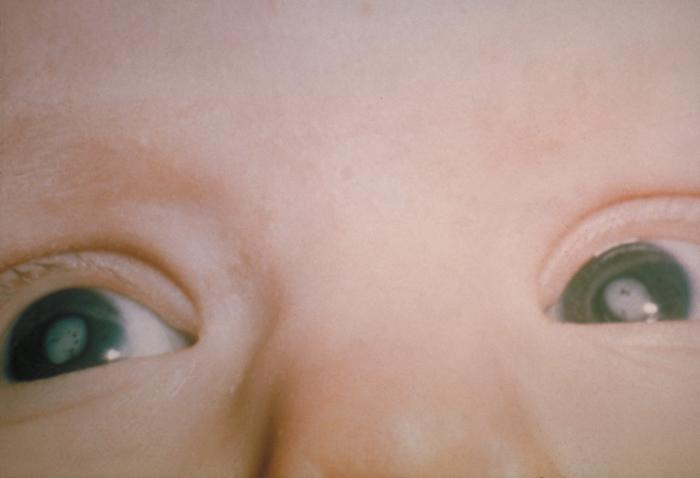
- Congenital cataract is one of the symptoms of this syndrome
- Specialty: Medical genetics, ophthalmology.
- Prevention: none
- Treatment: Cochlear implant, correctional surgery (cataracts)
- Prognosis: Good
- Frequency: very rare, only two cases have been reported in medical literature

Cataract-ataxia-deafness syndrome is a very rare genetic disorder which is characterized by mild intellectual disabilities, congenital cataracts, progressive hearing loss, ataxia, peripheral neuropathy, and short height. Only two cases have been reported in medical literature.

It was first described in December 1991, when Begeer et al. described two sisters in their 50s with the symptoms mentioned above. They had surgery when they were young to remove the cataracts, they started showing progressive deafness since they were 30 years old, one of the sisters was 152 cm tall and the other was 155 cm tall. Additional findings included absence of deep tendon reflexes and decreased sensation in the distal parts of the limbs. They (Begeer et al.) concluded that this case was part of a separate entity different from the ataxia-deafness-mental retardation syndrome since the patients had congenital cataracts, ataxia, and progressive deafness.
