= X-linked recessive chondrodysplasia punctata =

- Specialty: Medical genetics

X-linked recessive chondrodysplasia punctata is a type of chondrodysplasia punctata that can involve the skin, hair, and cause short stature with skeletal abnormalities, cataracts, and deafness.

This condition is also known as arylsulfatase E deficiency, CDPX1, and X-linked recessive chondrodysplasia punctata 1. The syndrome rarely affects females, but they can be carriers of the recessive allele. Although the exact number of people diagnosed with CDPX1 is unknown, it was estimated that 1 in 500,000 have CDPX1 in varying severity. This condition is not linked to a specific ethnicity. The mutation that leads to a deficiency in arylsulfatase L (ARSL) occurs in the coding region of the gene. Absence of stippling, deposits of calcium, of bones and cartilage, shown on x-ray, does not rule out chondrodysplasia punctata or a normal chondrodysplasia punctata 1 (CDPX1) gene without mutation. Stippling of the bones and cartilage is rarely seen after childhood. Phalangeal abnormalities are important clinical features to look for once the stippling is no longer visible. Other, more severe, clinical features include respiratory abnormalities, hearing loss, cervical spine abnormalities, delayed cognitive development, ophthalmologic abnormalities, cardiac abnormalities, gastroesophageal reflux, and feeding difficulties. CDPX1 actually has a spectrum of severity; different mutations within the CDPX1 gene have different effects on the catalytic activity of the ARSL protein. The mutations vary between missense, nonsense, insertions, and deletions.

== Cause ==
The only known cause of this condition is a mutation in the X-linked chondrodysplasia punctata 1 (CDPX1) gene. Mutations in this gene result in a deficiency of arylsulfatase L. Only 50-60% of cases have been shown to have mutations in this gene and the cause of the remaining cases is not yet known. The CDPX1 gene is located on the short arm of the X chromosome (Xp22.3) on the Crick (minus) strand. It is 33,614 bases in length.

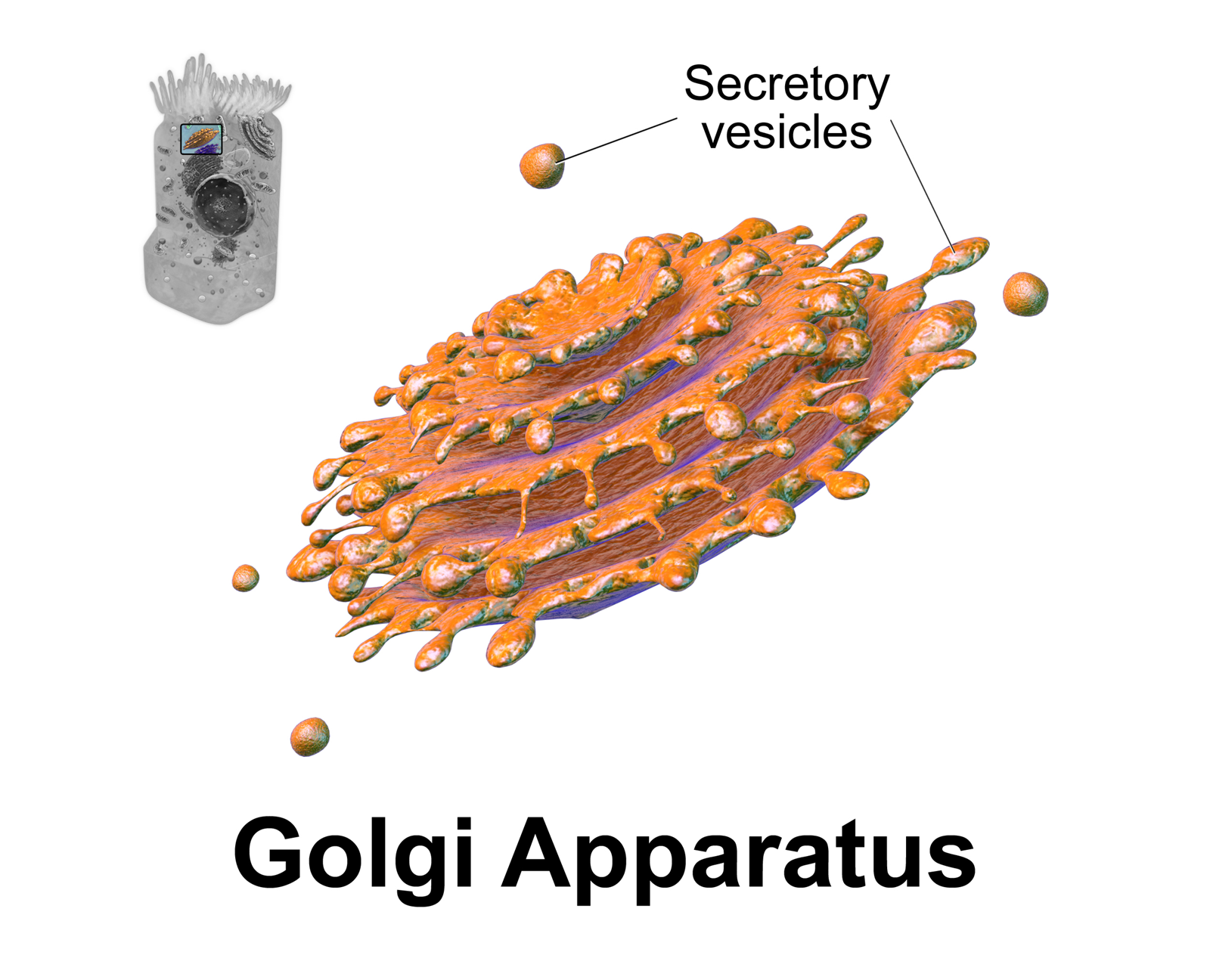

The mature protein has a molecular weight of 68 kilodaltons. It is glycosylated and is located in the Golgi apparatus. Its activity may be inhibited by warfarin. It seems likely that warfarin induced embryotoxicity may be due at least in part to this inhibition.

Brachytelephalangic chondrodysplasia punctata (BCDP) is the non-genetic, or environmentally produced, phenocopies associated with CDPX1. Causes of BCDP can also come from genetic effects, mainly due to mutations. Keutel syndrome, deficiency of vitamin K epoxide reductase subunit 1 (VKORC1), gamma-glutamyl carboxylase (GGCX), Xp contiguous deletion syndromes, and multiple sulfatase deficiency are all genetic conditions that are associated BCDP.

== Diagnosis ==
This condition occurs almost exclusively in males. The mutation may be spontaneous or inherited from the mother. The typical clinical features are:

- flat nasal tip
- short columella
- maxillary hypoplasia
- involvement of terminal phalanges
- stippled chondrodystrophy

=== Biochemical confirmation ===
The activity of arylsulfatase L can be measured with the substrate 4-methylumbelliferyl sulfate.

== Treatment ==
CDPX1 activity may be inhibited by warfarin because it is believed that ARSL has enzymatic activity in a vitamin K producing biochemical pathway. Vitamin K is also needed for controlling binding of calcium to bone and other tissues within the body.

== See also ==
- List of cutaneous conditions
- List of radiographic findings associated with cutaneous conditions
