= Trisomy 22 =

- Chromosome 22
- Specialty: Medical genetics
- Complications: Miscarriage
- Usual onset: Prenatal
- Duration: Lifelong
- Prognosis: Generally miscarried in the first trimester

Trisomy 22 is a chromosomal disorder in which three copies of chromosome 22 are present rather than two. It is a frequent cause of spontaneous abortion during the first trimester of pregnancy. Progression to the second trimester and live births are rare. This disorder is found in individuals with an extra copy or a variation of chromosome 22 in some or all cells of their bodies.

== Associated disorders ==
Many kinds of disorders are associated with trisomy 22:

- Emanuel syndrome is named after the genetic contributions made by researcher Dr. Beverly Emanuel. This condition is assigned to individuals born with an unbalanced 11/22 translocation. That is, a fragment of chromosome 11 is moved, or translocated, to chromosome 22.
- 22q11 deletion syndrome is a rare condition which occurs in about one in 4000 births. This condition is identified when a band in the q11.2 section of the arm of chromosome 22 is missing or deleted. This condition has several different names: 22q11.2 deletion syndrome, velocardiofacial syndrome, DiGeorge syndrome, conotruncal anomaly face syndrome, Opitz G/BBB syndrome, and Cayler cardiofacial syndrome. The effects of this disorder are different in each individual, but similarities exist, such as heart defects, immune system problems, a distinctive facial appearance, learning challenges, cleft palate, hearing loss, kidney problems, hypocalcemia, and sometimes psychiatric issues.
- 22q11 microduplication syndrome is the opposite of the 22q11 deletion syndrome; in this condition, a band of q.11.2 section of chromosome 22 is duplicated. Individuals carrying this deficiency are relatively "normal", as in they do not possess any major birth defects or major medical illnesses. This microduplication is more common than the deletion; this might relate to the milder phenotype of the individuals.
- 22q13 deletion syndrome (Phelan–McDermid syndrome) is a condition caused by the deletion of the tip of the q arm on chromosome 22. Most individuals with this disorder experience cognitive delays, low muscle tone, and sleeping, eating, and behavioural issues.
- Ring chromosome 22 is a rare disorder caused by the break and rejoining of both ends of chromosome 22, forming a ring. The effects on the individual with this disorder are dependent on the amount of genetic information lost during the process. Major characteristics of this disorder are intellectual disability, muscle weakness, and lack of coordination.
- Cat eye syndrome (Schmid Fraccaro syndrome) is a condition caused by a partial trisomy or tetrasomy in chromosome 22. A small extra chromosome is found, made up of the top half of chromosome 22 and a portion of the q arm at the q11.2 break. This chromosome can be found three or four times. This syndrome is referred to as "cat eye" due to the eye appearance of reported affected individuals who have coloboma of the iris, but this feature is only seen in about half of the cases.
- Mosaic trisomy 22 is a disorder in which an extra chromosome 22 is found only in some cells of the body. The severity of each case is determined by the number of cells with this extra copy. Some characteristics of individuals with this condition are cardiac abnormalities, growth retardation, mental delay, etc.
- Complete trisomy 22, in contrast with mosaic trisomy 22, is characterized by an extra copy of chromosome 22 found in each cell of the body of the affected individual. As of 2014, 29 live-born human cases have been reported, with all of them dying before the age of 12 months.
