= Cleft palate short stature vertebral anomalies syndrome =

Cleft palate-short stature-vertebral anomalies syndrome
- Other names: Mathieu-De Broca-Bony syndrome
- Specialty: Medical genetics
- Symptoms: Vertebral anomalies, intellectual disabilities, short stature, cleft palate
- Usual onset: Birth
- Duration: Life-long
- Causes: Autosomal dominant inheritance
- Prevention: none
- Prognosis: Good
- Frequency: very rare, only 2 cases from one family have been recorded in medical literature

Cleft palate short stature vertebral anomalies, also known as Mathieu-De Broca-Bony syndrome, is a very rare multi-systemic genetic disorder which is characterized by congenital cleft palate, facial dysmorphisms, short stature and neck, vertebral abnormalities and intellectual disabilities. It is thought to be inherited in an autosomal dominant fashion.

== Presentation ==
People with this disorder usually show the following symptoms:

- Cleft palate
- Facial asymmetry
- Epicanthal folds
- Short nose
- Anteverted nostrils
- Low-set ears
- Reduced thickness of upper lip
- Micrognathism
- Short stature
- Short neck
- Vertebral abnormalities
- Intellectual disabilities
- Single transversal palmar line

== Etiology ==
This disorder was first discovered in 1993 by M Mathieu et al., when they described an adult man and his (also affected) son with the symptoms mentioned above, since then, no other cases of the disorder have been described in medical literature.
