= Coloboma of macula-brachydactyly type B syndrome =

- Other names: Sorsby syndrome
- Autosomal dominant pattern
- Specialty: Medical genetics, Ophthalmology
- Symptoms: Mainly coloboma with type B brachydactyly
- Usual onset: Birth
- Duration: Lifelong
- Prevention: None
- Frequency: rare
- Deaths: -

Coloboma of macula-brachydactyly type B syndrome, also known as Sorbsy syndrome is a rare genetic disorder which is characterized by bilateral macular coloboma, nystagmus of the horizontal pendular type, visual impairment, and brachydactyly type B. Additional findings include congenital anonychia, broad/duplication of the thumbs and big toes, syndactyly and camptodactyly. It is inherited in an autosomal dominant manner. It has been described in 9 members of a 4-generation British family.
