= Chondrodysplasia punctata =

- Specialty: Medical genetics

Chondrodysplasia punctata is a clinically and genetically diverse group of rare diseases, first described by Erich Conradi (1882–1968), that share the features of stippled epiphyses and skeletal changes.

== Types ==
- Rhizomelic chondrodysplasia punctata 215100, 222765, 600121
- X-linked recessive chondrodysplasia punctata 302950
- Conradi–Hünermann syndrome (chondrodysplasia punctata 2, x-linked dominant) 302960
- Autosomal dominant chondrodysplasia punctata 118650

== See also ==
- List of cutaneous conditions
- List of radiographic findings associated with cutaneous conditions
