= Ectrodactyly with tibia aplasia/hypoplasia =

- Other names: Aplasia of tibia with ectrodactyly, tibial aplasia with split-hand/split-foot deformity, etrodactyly with aplasia of long bones, split-hand/foot malformation with long bone deficiency, SHFLD
- Specialty: Medical genetics, Pediatry
- Symptoms: Ectrodactyly with missing/underdeveloped tibia.
- Complications: Grip (ectrodactyly), walking (tibia abnormality)
- Usual onset: Pre-natal
- Duration: Life-long
- Types: SHFLD1, 2 and 3
- Causes: Genetic mutation
- Risk factors: Having close relatives with the disorder
- Diagnostic method: Physical evaluation, radiography
- Prevention: none
- Prognosis: Good
- Frequency: very rare.

Ectrodactyly with tibia aplasia/hypoplasia also known as cleft hand absent tibia is a very rare limb malformation syndrome which is characterized by ectrodactyly, and aplasia/hypoplasia of the tibia bone. Additional findings include cup-shaped ears, pre-postaxial polydactyly, and hypoplasia of the big toes, femur, patella, and ulnae bone. It is inherited as an autosomal dominant trait with reduced penetrance.

== Etymology ==
This disorder was first discovered in 1967, by Roberts et al. when he described a four-generation family with absence of the middle finger and missing tibia bones. Since then, 9 more families with the disorder have been described, leaving us with a total of 10 families worldwide known to medical literature with the disorder.

The following loci are associated with the different types of SHFLD: 1q42.2-43 (SHFLD1), 6q14.1 (SHFLD2), and 17p13.3 (SHFLD3). The mutations in the loci were found when the entire genome of a large Arab consanguineous family was analyzed.
