= Czeizel syndrome =

Genetic disorder

Czeizel syndrome, also known as Lethal omphalocele-cleft palate syndrome, is a rare dysmorphic syndrome characterized by a cleft lip, a bifid uvula, bilateral talipes equinovarus, bicornuate uterus, and hydrocephalus internus.

== Symptoms ==
Usually, Czeizel Syndrome is seen during pregnancy and as a newborn.
