= Distal trisomy 10q =

- Other names: Distal duplication 10q, Telomeric duplication 10q, Trisomy 10qter
- Ideogram of the human chromosome 10.
- Pronunciation: /ˈdɪs.təl/ /ˈtrɪ.sə.mi/ /ten/ /kjuː/
- Specialty: Medical genetics
- Symptoms: Slow postnatal growth, hypotonia, lack of coordination, intellectual disability, digestive issues, heart and kidney problems
- Usual onset: At birth
- Duration: Lifelong

Distal trisomy 10 is a rare chromosomal disorder that causes several physical defects and intellectual disability.

Humans, like all sexually reproducing species, have somatic cells that are in diploid [2N] state, meaning that N represent the number of chromosomes, and 2 the number of their copies. In humans, there are 23 chromosomes, but there are two sets of them, one from mother and one from father, totaling in 46, that are arranged according to their size, function and genes they carry. Each cell is supposed to have two of each, but sometimes due to mutations or malfunctions during cell division, mistakes are made that cause serious health problems. One such error is the cause of Distal trisomy 10q disorder.

Each chromosome has two arms, labeled p (for petite, or short) and q (for long). If both arms are equal in length, the chromosome is said to be metacentric. If arms' lengths are unequal, chromosome is said to be submetacentric, and if p arm is so short that is hard to observe, but still present, then the chromosome is acrocentric. In Distal Trisomy 10q disorder, end or distal portion of the q (long) arm of the chromosome number 10 appears to be present three times, rather than two times as it is supposed to be. This extra arm results in chromosome 10 trisomy, meaning that three arms are present. Depending on the length of the aberrant arm, the severity can vary from case to case. Often the source of this chromosomal error is a translocation in one of the parents. Sometimes it occurs spontaneously, in which case it is termed de novo.

This syndrome has a large range of outcomes depending on how much chromosomal material is involved. Outcomes include: very slow postnatal growth, hypotonia, lack of coordination skills and mild to severe cases of intellectual disability, digestive issues, and heart and kidney problems. Individuals with this disorder can also be distinguished by their facial features. Number of support groups do exist in the United States, where affected families can meet and discuss problems they encounter, possible treatments and can find emotional support.

== See also ==
- Down syndrome
- Turner syndrome
- Klinefelter's syndrome
