= Trisomy 9 =

- Other names: Skull dysmorphisms, nervous system problems, developmental delay
- chromosome 9
- Specialty: Medical genetics
- Complications: Coffin–Siris syndrome
- Usual onset: At birth
- Types: Complete, mosaic, partial
- Causes: Three copies of Chromosome 9
- Diagnostic method: Karyotype
- Prognosis: Invariably fatal, no known effective treatment

Full trisomy 9 is a rare and fatal chromosomal disorder caused by having three copies (trisomy) of chromosome 9. It can be a viable condition if the trisomic component affects only part of the cells of the body (mosaicism) or in cases of partial trisomy of the short arm (trisomy 9p) in which cells have a normal set of two entire chromosomes 9 plus part of a third copy of the short arm ("p") of the chromosome.

== Presentation ==
Symptoms vary but usually result in dysmorphisms in the skull, nervous system problems, and developmental delay. Dysmorphisms in the heart, kidneys, and musculoskeletal system may also occur. An infant with complete trisomy 9 surviving 20 days after birth showed clinical features including a small face, wide fontanelle, prominent occiput, micrognathia, low-set ears, upslanting palpebral fissures, high-arched palate, short sternum, overlapping fingers, limited hip abduction, rocker-bottom feet, heart murmurs and a webbed neck.

Trisomy 9p is one of the most frequent autosomal anomalies compatible with a long survival rate. A study of five cases showed an association with Coffin–Siris syndrome, as well as a wide gap between the first and second toes in all five, while three had brain malformations including dilated ventricles with hypogenesis of the corpus callosum and Dandy–Walker malformation.

== Diagnosis ==
Trisomy 9 can be detected prenatally with chorionic villus sampling and cordocentesis, and can be suggested by obstetric ultrasonography.

Because trisomy 9 may appear with mosaicism, it is suggested that doctors take samples from multiple tissues when karyotyping for diagnosis.

== Mosaic trisomy 9 ==
Mosaic trisomy 9 is a rare disorder where only some of the cells are affected. Only 150 cases have been reported worldwide as of 2020. Symptom severity increases as the amount of affected cells goes up.

Except one, all people with mosaic trisomy 9 are intellectually disabled to some extent, have cardiac defects, along with microcephaly and difficulty feeding. They also typically have distinctive facial characteristics, consisting of a prominent nose bridge, fleshy nose tip, facial asymmetry, malformed ears, slit-like nostrils, and a cleft palate.

Outcomes for people with mosaic trisomy 9 vary greatly. Some patients do not make it past infancy and early childhood, while others can live into adulthood. Some people with mosaic trisomy 9 are nonverbal but can communicate via sign language or alternative and augmentive communication devices with success.

Due to the rarity of the disorder, it may be clinically misdiagnosed.
