= Megaureter =

- Specialty: Urology

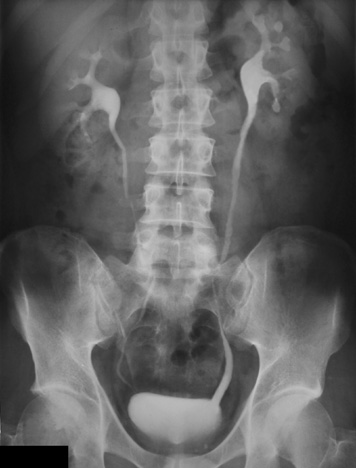
An IVU image showing the Kidneys, Ureter and Bladder.

Megaureter is a medical anomaly whereby the ureter is abnormally dilated. Congenital megaureter is an uncommon condition which is more common in males, may be bilateral, and is often associated with other congenital anomalies. The cause is thought to be failed peristalsis of the distal ureter, leading to dilatation.

The cutoff value for megaureter is when it is wider than 6 or 7 mm.

A functional obstruction at the lower end of the ureter leads to progressive dilatation and a tendency to infection. The ureteric orifice appears normal and a ureteric catheter passes easily.

Definitive surgical treatment involves refashioning the lower end of the affected ureter so that a tunnelled reimplantation into the bladder can be done to prevent reflux.
