= Palpebral fissure =

Fissure separating the eyelids

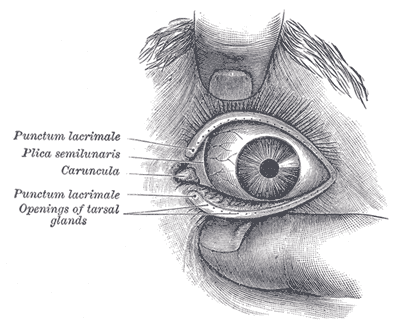
- Front of left eye with eyelids separated to show medial canthus (Palpebral fissure, visible but not labeled, is artificially widened.)

Details
- Synonyms: Interpalpebral fissure

Identifiers
- Latin: rima palpebrarum
- TA98: A15.2.07.030
- TA2: 205
- FMA: 59110

The palpebral fissure is the elliptic space between the medial and lateral canthi of the two open eyelids. In simple terms, it is the opening between the eyelids. In adult humans, this measures about 10 mm vertically and 30 mm horizontally.

== Variations ==
=== Congenital dysmorphisms ===
It can be reduced (short, "narrow") in horizontal size by fetal alcohol syndrome and in Williams syndrome. The chromosomal conditions trisomy 9 and trisomy 21 (Down syndrome) can cause the palpebral fissures to be upslanted, whereas Marfan syndrome can cause a downslant. An increase in vertical height can be seen in genetic disorders such as cri-du-chat syndrome.

=== Acquired ===
The fissure may be increased in vertical height in Graves' disease, which is manifested as Dalrymple's sign. It is seen in disorders such as cri-du-chat syndrome.

In animal studies using four times the therapeutic concentration of the ophthalmic solution latanoprost, the size of the palpebral fissure can be increased. The condition is reversible. Latanoprost is a prostaglandin F receptor agonist.

== See also ==
- Blepharophimosis
