= ANKRD24 =

Protein-coding gene in the species Homo sapiens

Identifiers
- Aliases: ANKRD24, ankyrin repeat domain 24
- External IDs: MGI: 1890394; GeneCards: ANKRD24

Gene location (Human)
Chr.	Chromosome 19 (human)
Band	19p13.3	Start	4,182,689 bp
Band	19p13.3	End	4,224,814 bp

Gene location (Mouse)
Chr.	Chromosome 10 (mouse)
Band	10 C1|10 39.72 cM	Start	81,464,374 bp
Band	10 C1|10 39.72 cM	End	81,483,444 bp
RNA expression pattern
Bgee	Human / Mouse (ortholog); Top expressed in: right frontal lobe; Brodmann area 9; anterior cingulate cortex; prefrontal cortex; right lobe of liver; sural nerve; right testis; left testis; caudate nucleus; amygdala / Top expressed in: motor neuron; substantia nigra; utricle; vestibular sensory epithelium; trigeminal ganglion; fossa; internal carotid artery; condyle; aortic valve; Paneth cell; More reference expression data
BioGPS	n/a
Orthologs
Databases	NCBI: entry; OMA: entry
Species	Human	Mouse
Entrez	170961	70615
Ensembl	ENSG00000089847	ENSMUSG00000054708
UniProt	Q8TF21	Q80VM7
RefSeq (mRNA)	NM_133475; NM_001393552; NM_001393553; NM_001393555; NM_001393556 NM_001393557; NM_001393985	NM_027480; NM_001374016
RefSeq (protein)	NP_597732	NP_081756; NP_001360945
Location (UCSC)	Chr 19: 4.18 – 4.22 Mb	Chr 10: 81.46 – 81.48 Mb
PubMed search
- Wikidata
View/Edit Human	View/Edit Mouse

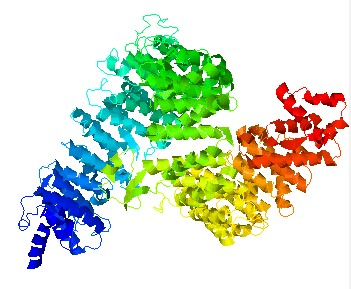
Predicted tertiary structure of ANKRD24 using I-TASSER

Ankyrin repeat domain-containing protein 24 is a protein in humans that is coded for by the ANKRD24 gene. The gene is also known as KIAA1981. The protein's function in humans is currently unknown. ANKRD24 is in the protein family that contains ankyrin-repeat domains.

== Gene ==
=== Locus ===
Cytochromatic location of ANKRD24 gene

ANKRD24 gene neighborhood

The gene is located on chromosome 19 at p13.3 on the forward strand. The gene is 4041 base pairs in length and contains 29 exons. The gene is neighbored by the gene SIRT6 that encodes for the Sirtuin-6 protein and the EBI3 gene that encodes for the Epstein-Barr virus induced gene 3 protein.

=== Expression ===
The expression pattern of ANKRD24 is uncharacterized. Under conditions of cell growth and proliferation, the expression levels increase. In germ line tumors, glioma, and prostate cancer, the expression is elevated relative to other disease states. During development, the expression level is elevated in the blastocyst stage. In adults, there are elevated levels of expression in the placenta, stomach, kidneys, and eye relative to other tissues. However, the results of experimental gene expression profiles are inconsistent relative to ANKRD24 expression, suggesting redundancy of the gene and its protein product.

== mRNA ==
=== Alternative expression ===
13 transcription splice variants of ANKRD24 mRNA have been predicted.

== Protein ==
=== General features ===
The ANKRD24 protein is 1146 amino acids in length, has a molecular weight of 124kDa, and has an isoelectric point of 4.98. The secondary structure is predicted to consist of all alpha helices and to not contain any beta strands. The tertiary structure of the protein is predicted to be a helical twist.

=== Composition ===
ANKRD24 has a relatively high composition of alanine (15.0%), glutamic acid (13.5%), and leucine (11.0%) and a relatively low composition of cysteine (1.5%), phenylalanine (0.7%), tryptophan (0.2%), and tyrosine (0.8%). The protein contains positive run clusters that could be nuclear localization signals. The protein does not have any significant negative charge clusters and no significant charge patterns.

=== Subcellular localization ===
The ANKRD24 protein is predicted to localize in the nucleus of cells.

=== Domains ===
ANKRD24 is in the protein family that contains ankyrin-repeat domains. Ankyrin repeats are known for mediating protein-protein interactions. The protein also contains two coiled-coil regions.

=== Post-translational modification ===
ANKRD24 is predicted to undergo C-mannosylation.

=== Interacting proteins ===
ANKRD24 is predicted to interact with disks large homolog 4 (DLG4), eukaryotic translation elongation factor 1-alpha 1 (EEF1A1), unc-119 homolog A (UNC119), replication timing regulatory factor 1 (RIF1), protein kinase C and casein kinase substrate in neurons 1 (PACSIN1), nuclear factor NF-kappa-B p105 subunit (NFKB1), cholest-5-ene-3β,7α-diol 3β-dehydrogenase (HSD3B7), lethal giant larvae homolog 2 (L2GL2), and glucocorticoid induced 1 (GLC)CI1. No characterization of these interactions has yet to be observed.

=== Homology ===
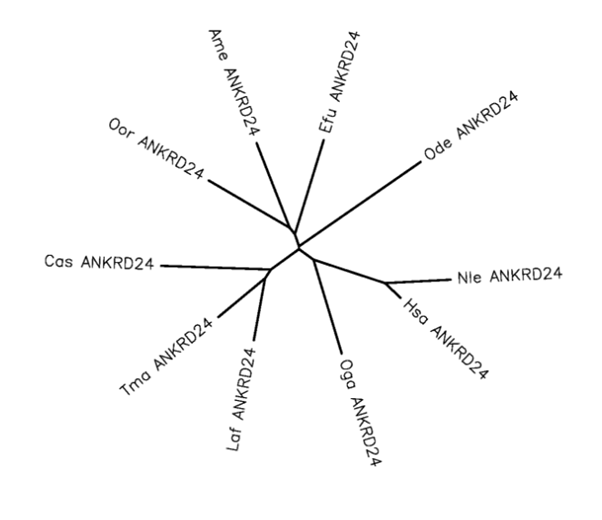
ANKRD24 unrooted phylogenetic tree

ANKRD24 has no human paralogs. Orthologous proteins are found in other organisms. The following table represents some of the orthologs found using searches in BLAST and BLAT. However, this list is not exhaustive for the orthologs of ANKRD24 and is only meant to display the wide diversity of species for which orthologs of ANKRD24 can be found.

	Genus species	Common Name	Date of Divergence (MYA)	Accession # (Nucleotide)	Accession # (Protein)	Sequence Length (bp)	Sequence Length (aa)	E value	Sequence Identity (%)	Sequence Similarity (%)
1	Homo sapiens	Humans	0	NM_133475.1	NP_597732.1	4041	1146		100	100
2	Nomascus leucogenys	Northern white-cheeked gibbon	19.9	XM_012503370.1	XP_012358824.1	3675	1165	0	95	96
3	Otolemur garnettii	Small-eared galago	75.9	XM_012804592.1	XP_012660046.1	4181	1035	0	83	87
4	Trichechus manatus latirostris	Florida Manatee	105	XM_004378459.1	]	3354	1117	0	81	86
5	Eptesicus fuscus	Big brown bat	97.5	XM_008150610.1	XP_008148832.1	3369	1122	0	80	84
6	Ailuropoda melanoleuca	Giant panda	97.5	XM_002928471.2	XP_002928517.1	3729	1116	0	80	84
7	Loxodonta africana	African savanna elephant	105	XM_003421925.2	XP_003421973.1	4049	1345	0	79	85
8	Octodon degus	Degu	90.9	XM_004632746.1	XP_004632803.1	3381	1126	0	79	84
9	Chrysochloris asiatica	Cape golden mole	105	XM_006869037.1	XP_006869099.1	3747	1248	0	78	85
10	Orcinus orca	Killer Whale	97.5	XM_004277648.2	XP_004277696.1	3482	1079	0	77	82
11	Chelonia mydas	Green sea turle	320.5	XM_007072230.1	XP_007072292	3051	1016	9.00E-178	63	77
12	Ficedula albicollis	Collared flycatcher	320.5	XM_005060250.1	XP_005060307	1885	621	2.00E-171	60	74
13	Gekko Japonicus	Japanese gecko	320.5	XM_015410656.1	XP_015266142	3057	1019	3.00E-175	58	75
14	Python bivittatus	Burmese python	320.5	XM_007434390	XP_007434452	3192	1063	1.00E-167	58	75
15	Falco cherrug	Saker falcon	320.5	XM_014277718.1	XP_014133193	1431	476	0	57	71
16	Stegastes partitus	Bicolor damselfish	429.6	XM_008295305.1	XP_008293527.1	3629	1095	2.00E-90	41	55
17	Trichomonas vaginalis G3	Trichomonas vaginalis	2040	XM_001329224.1	XP_001329259	774	257	2.00E-24	34	54
18	Ciona intestinalis	Vase tunicate	733	XM_009863371.1	XP_009861673	3156	956	9.00E-24	32	48
19	Talaromyces stipitatus	Fungi	1302.5	XM_002486774.1	XP_002486819.1	3216	1071	3.00E-18	32	51
20	Cryptococcus neoformans	Yeast	1302.5	XM_012197089.1	XP_012052479.1	943	236	3.00E-16	32	51
