= Överkalix study =

Epigenetics study conducted in Sweden

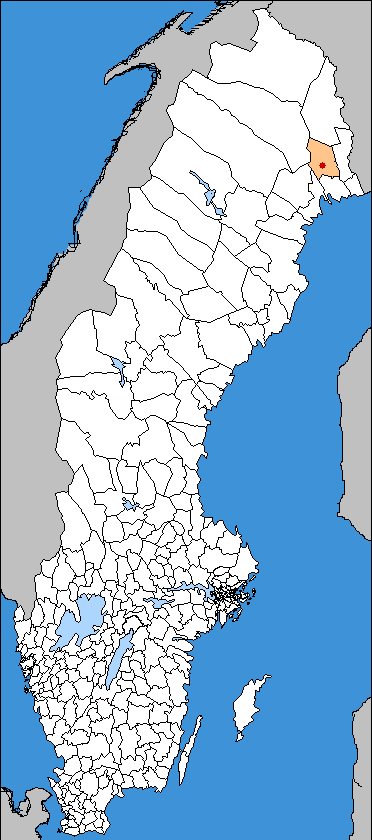
Location of Överkalix, Sweden

The Överkalix study (Swedish: Överkalixstudien) was a study conducted on the physiological effects of various environmental factors on transgenerational epigenetic inheritance. The study was called "Cardiovascular and diabetes mortality determined by nutrition during parents’ and grandparents’ slow growth period" and was published in the journal European Journal of Human Genetics in 2002. The study was conducted utilizing historical records, including harvests and food prices, in Överkalix, a small isolated municipality in northeast Sweden. Mortality risk ratios (RR) on children and grandchildren were determined based on available food supply, as indicated by these historical data.

The study started with 320 probands, 164 men and 139 women, born in 1890, 1905, or 1920, and their 1,818 children and grandchildren. 44 were still alive in 1995 when mortality follow-up stopped and other issues (eg. missing birthyear, cause of death unknown) reduced the final analysis to 239 probands. Between 7-22% of these were further removed from each ancestor-specific analysis due to the ancestor experiencing both "good" and "bad" years during the sample period.

The study found that a severe increase/decrease in food supply in male ancestors shortly before puberty was linked to a change in death rates from cardiovascular disease (CVD) and diabetes rates in their descendants. In particular children of a father who suffered a deficit of food had lower rates of deaths from CVD, and a paternal grandfather who suffered a similar deficit saw a reduction in deaths from diabetes in their grandchildren. Conversely a surplus in food supply for a paternal grandfather saw a 4-fold increase in the number of diabetes-related deaths in their grandchildren.

These effects were observed correlating with food surplus/deficit during the slow growth period (SGP). The SGP is the time before the start of puberty, when environmental factors have a larger impact on the body. The ancestors' SGP in this study, was set between the ages of 9-12 for boys and 8–10 years for girls. This occurred in the SGP of both grandparents, or during the gestation period/infant life of the grandmothers, but not during either grandparent's puberty.

The study notes a number of potential issues, including small sample sizes, borderline statistical significance, progeny size effects, puberty estimation, regional food access and environmental effects. A 2018 study attempted to replicate these findings using a much larger sample of over 11,500 grandchildren using data from the Uppsala Multigeneration Study. It failed to replicate the association with either cardiovascular or diabetes mortality, but did report an increased all-cause mortality correlated to SGP food intake, mostly due to cancer.

Sex-specific effects can be due to parental imprinting, a process that results in allele-specific differences in transcription, DNA methylation, and DNA replication timing. Imprinting is an important process in human development, and its deregulation can cause certain defined disease states of other imprinted human disease loci. The establishment of parental imprints occurs during gametogenesis as homologous DNA passes through sperm or egg; subsequently during embryogenesis and into adulthood, alleles of imprinted genes are maintained in two "conformational"/epigenetic states: paternal or maternal. Thus, genomic imprints template their own replication, are heritable, can be identified by molecular analysis, and serve as markers of the parental origin of genomic regions.

The estimation of percentage of human genes subject to parental imprinting is approximately one to two percent, currently parental imprinting has been identified in fewer than 100 distinct named genes.

== See also ==
- Dutch famine of 1944–45
