= Överkalix =

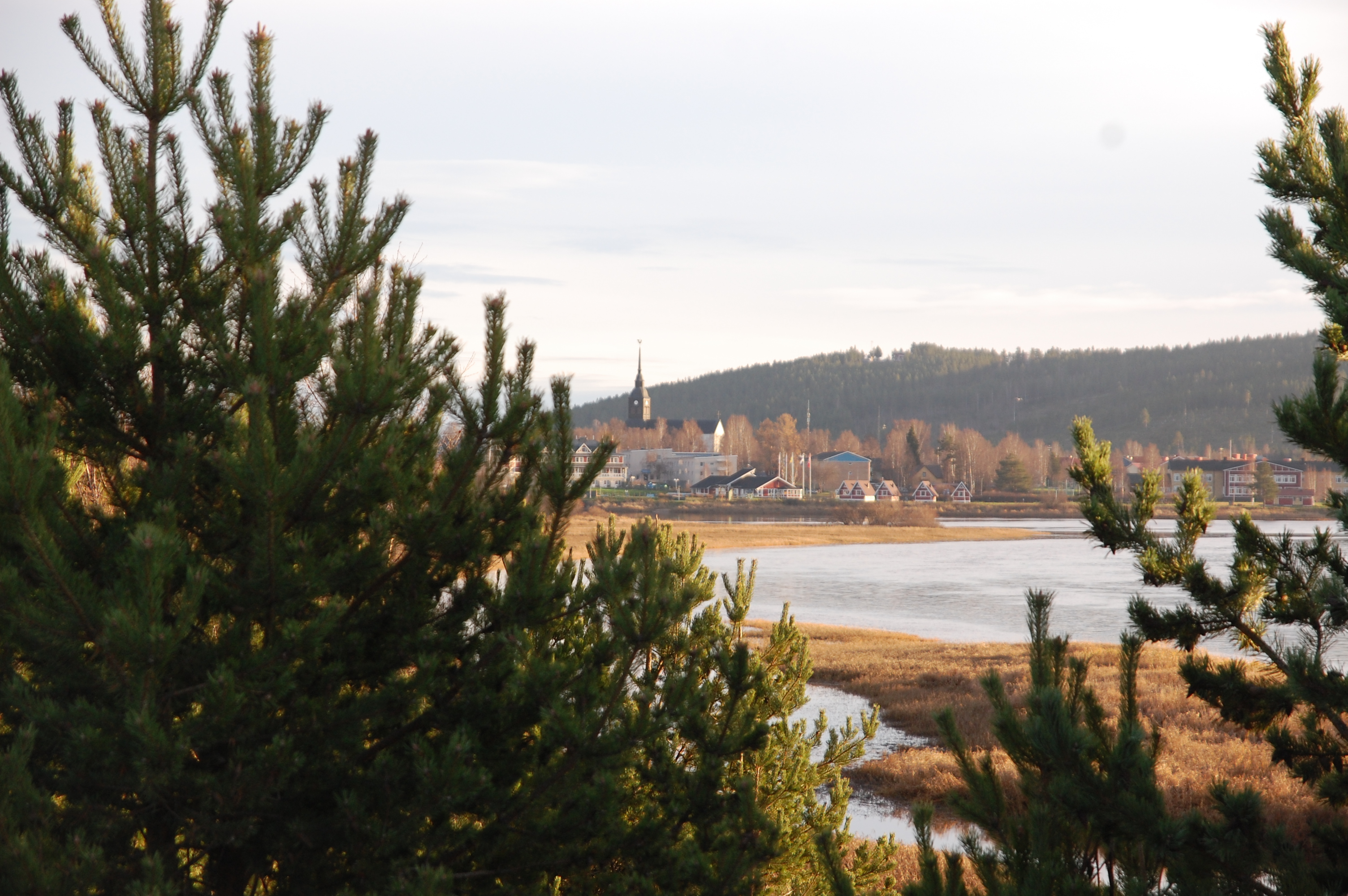
- Överkalix

- Location within Norrbotten Location within Sweden
- Coordinates: 66°21′N 22°53′E
- Country: Sweden
- Province: Norrbotten
- County: Norrbotten County
- Municipality: Överkalix Municipality

Area
  - Total: 1.06 km^{2} (0.41 sq mi)

Population (31 December 2010)
  - Total: 975
  - Density: 919/km^{2} (2,380/sq mi)
- Time zone: UTC+1 (CET)
  - Summer (DST): UTC+2 (CEST)

Överkalix (Swedish: [ˈø̂ːvɛrˌkɑːlɪks]; Finnish: Ylikainuu; Meänkieli: Ylikainus) is a locality and the seat of Överkalix Municipality in Norrbotten County, Sweden with 975 inhabitants in 2010.

== Climate ==
Överkalix has a subarctic climate with significant temperature differences between the warm short summers and the long and cold winters. Its inland position close to sea level ensures Överkalix is more prone to heatwaves than other areas of Norrbotten. Its July temperatures are also due to the perpetual daylight due to its position just below the Arctic Circle. This results in July days being warmer on average than other European cities as far south as Manchester and Dublin in the British Isles. However, temperatures fall quickly once daylight diminishes, but winters are still less severe than other parts of the world at similar parallels due to mild North Atlantic air somewhat tempering cold extremes. The climate is quite dry for Scandinavia, with average annual precipitation being at 450 millimetres (18 in).

Climate data for Överkalix 2002-2016; precipitation 1961-1990; extremes since 1962
| Month | Jan | Feb | Mar | Apr | May | Jun | Jul | Aug | Sep | Oct | Nov | Dec | Year |
|---|---|---|---|---|---|---|---|---|---|---|---|---|---|
| Record high °C (°F) | 9.8 (49.6) | 9.5 (49.1) | 11.8 (53.2) | 17.7 (63.9) | 30.6 (87.1) | 33.8 (92.8) | 32.7 (90.9) | 29.0 (84.2) | 22.8 (73.0) | 16.0 (60.8) | 12.5 (54.5) | 8.2 (46.8) | 33.8 (92.8) |
| Mean daily maximum °C (°F) | −7.5 (18.5) | −6.1 (21.0) | −0.1 (31.8) | 5.9 (42.6) | 13.5 (56.3) | 18.3 (64.9) | 21.7 (71.1) | 19.2 (66.6) | 13.2 (55.8) | 4.6 (40.3) | −1.6 (29.1) | −4.4 (24.1) | 6.3 (43.3) |
| Daily mean °C (°F) | −11.9 (10.6) | −10.6 (12.9) | −5.2 (22.6) | 1.2 (34.2) | 7.7 (45.9) | 12.9 (55.2) | 16.3 (61.3) | 14.0 (57.2) | 8.7 (47.7) | 1.3 (34.3) | −4.8 (23.4) | −8.5 (16.7) | 1.7 (35.1) |
| Mean daily minimum °C (°F) | −16.3 (2.7) | −15.1 (4.8) | −10.3 (13.5) | −3.5 (25.7) | 2.0 (35.6) | 7.6 (45.7) | 10.8 (51.4) | 8.8 (47.8) | 4.3 (39.7) | −1.9 (28.6) | −8.0 (17.6) | −12.6 (9.3) | −2.8 (27.0) |
| Record low °C (°F) | −46.0 (−50.8) | −40.3 (−40.5) | −37.9 (−36.2) | −23.6 (−10.5) | −9.7 (14.5) | −5.2 (22.6) | 1.3 (34.3) | −2.2 (28.0) | −12.3 (9.9) | −23.3 (−9.9) | −34.4 (−29.9) | −38.7 (−37.7) | −46.0 (−50.8) |
| Average precipitation mm (inches) | 31.3 (1.23) | 25.5 (1.00) | 26.1 (1.03) | 24.3 (0.96) | 27.4 (1.08) | 35.3 (1.39) | 50.6 (1.99) | 56.4 (2.22) | 49.3 (1.94) | 45.7 (1.80) | 44.1 (1.74) | 33.9 (1.33) | 450.0 (17.72) |
Source 1: SMHI precipitation average 1961-1990
Source 2: SMHI climate data 2002-2015

== Överkalix Study ==
The Överkalix study (Swedish: Överkalixstudien) was a study conducted on the physiological effects of various environmental factors on transgenerational epigenetic inheritance. The study was conducted utilizing historical records, including harvests and food prices, in Överkalix, a small isolated municipality in northeast Sweden. The study was of 303 probands, 164 men and 139 women, born in 1890, 1905, or 1920, and their 1,818 children and grandchildren. 44 were still alive in 1995 when mortality follow-up stopped. Mortality risk ratios (RR) on children and grandchildren were determined based on available food supply, as indicated by historical data.

== Buildings and structures ==
- 330 metres tall guyed mast for FM-/TV-broadcasting at 66°18'5" N, 22°51'13" E

== In Film ==
Överkalix was used as location for the Swedish films Frostbite and False Trail.
