= Splicing factor YJU2 =

Protein found in humans

YJU2

Identifiers
- Aliases: YJU2, coiled-coil domain containing 94, CCDC94, YJU2 splicing factor homolog
- External IDs: MGI: 1920136; GeneCards: YJU2

Gene location (Human)
Chr.	Chromosome 19 (human)
Band	19p13.3	Start	4,247,080 bp
Band	19p13.3	End	4,269,088 bp

Gene location (Mouse)
Chr.	Chromosome 17 (mouse)
Band	17|17 D	Start	56,266,099 bp
Band	17|17 D	End	56,275,285 bp
RNA expression pattern
Bgee	Human / Mouse (ortholog); Top expressed in: granulocyte; sural nerve; muscle of thigh; apex of heart; gastrocnemius muscle; mucosa of transverse colon; body of stomach; skin of abdomen; C1 segment; Achilles tendon / Top expressed in: lumbar spinal ganglion; intestinal villus; Ileal epithelium; choroid plexus of fourth ventricle; internal carotid artery; external carotid artery; otolith organ; yolk sac; utricle; hand; More reference expression data
BioGPS	n/a
Gene ontology
Molecular function	protein binding; metal ion binding
Cellular component	U2-type catalytic step 1 spliceosome; nucleus; spliceosomal complex
Biological process	negative regulation of DNA damage response, signal transduction by p53 class mediator; mRNA processing; RNA splicing
Sources:Amigo / QuickGO
Orthologs
Databases	NCBI: entry; OMA: entry
Species	Human	Mouse
Entrez	55702	72886
Ensembl	ENSG00000105248	ENSMUSG00000003208
UniProt	Q9BW85	Q9D6J3
RefSeq (mRNA)	NM_018074	NM_028381
RefSeq (protein)	NP_060544	NP_082657
Location (UCSC)	Chr 19: 4.25 – 4.27 Mb	Chr 17: 56.27 – 56.28 Mb
PubMed search
- Wikidata
View/Edit Human	View/Edit Mouse

Splicing factor YJU2 is a protein that in humans is encoded by the YJU2 gene (previously CCDC94). The YJU2 protein is part of the spliceosome, and is involved in process of RNA splicing: removing the introns from pre-mRNA to produce mature mRNA.

== Gene ==
=== Overview ===
Genomic location of CCDC94 at 19p13.3

CCDC94 is a 21,975 basepair gene orientated on the plus strand (see Sense) of chromosome 19 from 4,247,111-4,269,085. The gene product is a 1,441 base pair mRNA with 8 predicted exons in the human gene. As predicted by Ensemble, there exists one protein-coding alternative splice form. This splice form contains 5 exons, and 4 of them are coding exons. Promoter prediction and analysis was carried out using ElDorado. The predicted promoter region spans 714 basepairs from 4,246,532 to 4,247,245 on the plus strand of chromosome 19.

=== Gene neighborhood ===
CCDC94 is located directly adjacent to the EBI3 gene (4,229,540-4,237,525) on the positive DNA strand. The SH2 domain gene (4,278,598-4,290,720) lies upstream from CCDC94 on the positive strand.

=== Gene expression ===
CCDC94 is expressed in low to moderate levels throughout most regions of the body. However, slightly elevated levels of CCDC94 are expressed in the thyroid, lung, dendritic cells, and lymphoblasts. Expression data is available at BioGPS. GEO expression data is available from NCBI.

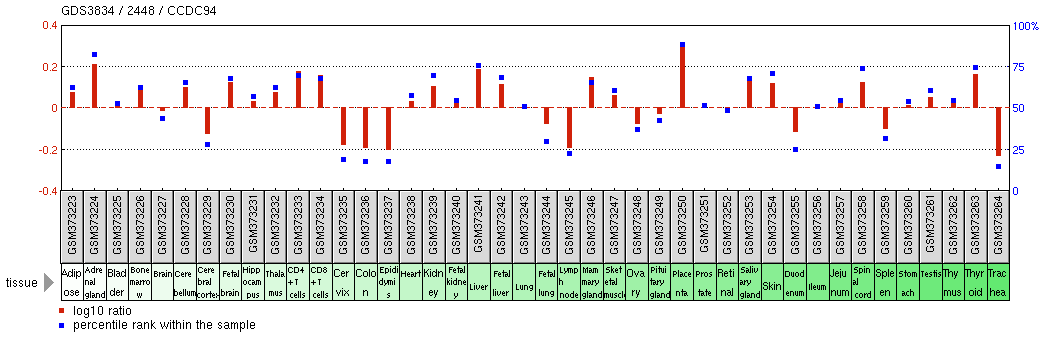
CCDC94 Geo profile expression in normal tissues.

== Protein ==
=== Properties and characteristics ===
CCDC94 belongs to the CWC16 family and its function is not well understood. The human form as 323 amino acid residues, with an isoelectric point of 5.618 and a molecular mass of 37,086 daltons. There are no predicted transmembrane domains. The one alternative splice form of CCDC94 encodes for a protein with 161 amino acids. A DUF572 and COG5134 domains are located at residues 1-319 and 7–108, respectively. The coiled-coil domain region is located at residues 105–206. The intracellular localization of CCDC94 has not yet been experimentally determined, but bioinformatic analysis using PSORT highly suggests CCDC94 resides in the nucleus due to the presence of nuclear localization signals.

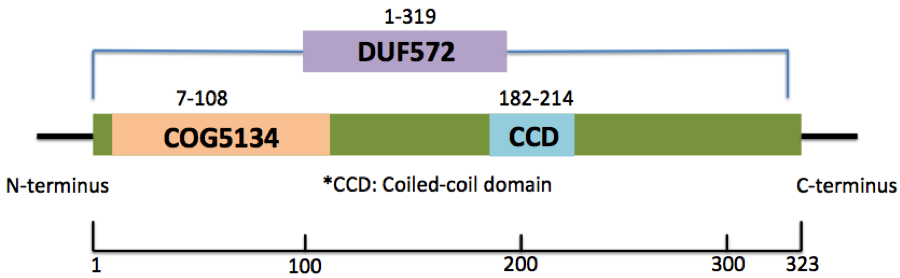
The CCDC94 protein construct, including the COG5134, DUF572, and coiled-coil domains.

=== Protein interactions ===
Protein interaction analysis for CCDC94 has been carried out using computational tools. No interactions were identified through the MINT database. CCDC94 is shown to interact with CDC5L, PLRG1, and PRPF19 with the highest score based on an anti tag coimmunoprecipitation assay. 6 additional interacting proteins were found. Closer analysis shows very little potential for these interactions to be real, thus none should be considered actual protein-protein interactions. The protein interaction from the STRING analysis is shown.

==== Transcription factors ====
CCDC94 has a promoter region that contains sites for transcription factor binding. Notable transcription factors, as generated by the ElDorado program on Genomatix:

- Myeloid zinc finger protein (MZF1)
- Forkhead box H1 (Foxh1)
- Polyomavirus enhancer A binding protein 3 (ETV4)
- E2F-myc activator/cell cycle regulator (E2F)
- SPI-1 proto-oncogene; hematopoietic transcription factor (PU1)

=== Post-translational modifications ===
Bioinformatic analysis of CCDC94 using NetPhos predicted 7 phosphorylation sites at serine residues, 3 at threonine residues, and 3 at tyrosine residues. Two of the threonine and all of the tyrosine phosphorylated residues are highly conserved as supported by their occurrence at the same location in several analyzed orthologs. Predicted phosphorylated tyrosines with high scores occurred on the N-terminus half of CCDC94 while serine residues are phosphorylated on the C-terminus half. Sulfinator predicted only one tyrosine sulfation site at amino acid 98. Highly probably sumoylation sites at residues 90, 24, and 270 were predicted by SUMOplot.

=== Tertiary structure ===
The tertiary structure of CCDC94 was shown to have several beta sheet regions and only one highly predicted alpha helix region. The PHYRE2 analysis of 65 residues of CCDC94, 20% of the entire amino acid sequence, was modeled with 87.9% confidence.

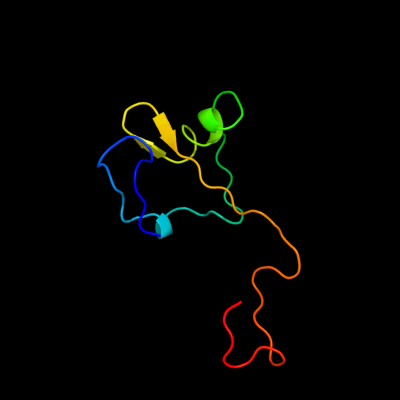
CCDC94 tertiary structure as predicted by PHYRE2.

== Homology ==
=== Orthologs ===
CCDC94 is very well conserved in many species, and the entire protein is conserved throughout all of its orthologs. However, conservation does not extend as far back as bacteria. A phylogenetic tree, generated from Biology WorkBench shows the evolutionary relationships between Homo sapiens CCDC94 and its orthologs. The table below show CCDC94 conservation among orthologs:

Genus Species	Organism Common Name	Divergence from Humans (MYA)	NCBI Protein Accession	Sequence Similarity	Protein Length
Pan panicous	Bonobo	6.3	XP_003819321.1	99%	323
Gorilla gorilla gorilla	Gorilla	8.8	XP_004059817.1	98%	286
Callithrix jacchus	Common marmoset	42.6	XP_002761642.1	83%	278
Mus musculus	Mouse	92.3	NP_082657.1	87%	314
Rattus norvegicus	Rat	92.4	NP_001103143.1	87%	313
Cricetulus griseus	Chinese hamster	92.4	XP_003501789.1	85%	321
Bos taurus	Cow	94.4	NP_001069159.1	89%	320
Felis catus	Cat	94.4	XP_003981794.1	73%	363
Sarcophilus harrisii	Tasmanian Devil	163.9	XP_003760628.1	78%	326
Monodelphis domestica	Opossum	163.9	XP_001374444.1	86%	326
Gallus gallus	Red junglefoul	296.4	XP_423475.3	84%	291
Anolis carolinensis	Lizard	324.5	XP_003230268.1	72%	311
Xenopou tropicalis	Western clawed frog	342.7	NP_001017176.1	73%	345
Xenopus laevis	African clawed frog	371.2	NP_001087648.1	83%	280
Takifugu rubripes	Puffer fish	454.6	XP_003962830.1	64%	348
Acyrthosiphon pisum	Pea aphid (insect)	910	NP_001155925.1	49%	278
Harpegnathos saltor	Ant	910	EFN80619.1	47%	351

=== Paralogs ===
CCDC94 has only one paralog, CCDC130 or MGC10471. CCDC130 is very similar to CCDC94, as it contains both the DUF572 and COG5134 domain.
