= Listed buildings in Norrbotten County =

There are 33 listed buildings (Swedish: byggnadsminne) in Norrbotten County.

== Arjeplog Municipality ==
There are no listed buildings in Arjeplog Municipality.

== Arvidsjaur Municipality ==
Image	Name	Premises	Number of buildings	Year built	Architect	Coordinates	ID
	Hängengården	Glommersträsk 2:51	4			65.26229°N 19.62444°E	21300000014925
	Lappstaden	Arvidsjaur 6:3 previously kyrkostaden1:1	86			65.59643°N 19.17101°E	21300000014930
	Nils Johan Larssons dalplats	Lomträskvattnet 1:1	2			65.86573°N 19.56702°E	21300000014933
	Torpet Granberget	Allmänningsskogen S:1	9			65.65543°N 19.42288°E	21300000014910

== Boden Municipality ==
Image	Name	Premises	Number of buildings	Year built	Architect	Coordinates	ID
	Artilleriregementet A8	Boden 1:129, 57:36	21			65.80437°N 21.67751°E	21300000014942
	Vittjärv, sommarstugan	Vittjärv 3:60	6			65.84751°N 21.55785°E	21300000014970
	Bebyggelsen på Laxholmen	Edefors 3:2	8			66.21981°N 20.85371°E	21300000014950
	Bodens fästning	Boden 1:129 m fl	8			65.81788°N 21.68840°E	21300000019119
	Bodens garnison	Boden 57:8, 57:11	7			65.82757°N 21.65140°E	21300000019120
	Boden järnvägsstation	Boden 56:40 previously Järnvägen 100:1	1			65.82882°N 21.70762°E	21300000014945
	Tygstationen i Boden (Trångforsområdet)	Boden 2:124	8			65.82874°N 21.62824°E	21300000024812
	Harads fd. ålderdomshem	Harads 7:23	2			66.07292°N 20.98207°E	21300000014967

== Gällivare Municipality ==
There are no listed buildings in Gällivare Municipality.

== Haparanda Municipality ==
Image	Name	Premises	Number of buildings	Year built	Architect	Coordinates	ID
	Forslundsgården i Vojakkala	Nedre Vojakkala 1:1	7			65.91703°N 24.09828°E	21300000014981
	Haparanda stationshus	Järnvägen 100:1	1			65.82814°N 24.13113°E	21300000014974

== Jokkmokk Municipality ==
Image	Name	Premises	Number of buildings	Year built	Architect	Coordinates	ID
	Armébatteriet Bomyrberget (Victoriafortet)	Vuollerim 37:1	1			66.41790°N 20.61279°E	21300000016689
	Bio Norden	Jokkmokk 9:8 previously Gästgivaren 1:35	1			66.60701°N 19.83289°E	21300000014986
	Porjus gamla kraftverk	Porjus 1:164	1			66.95435°N 19.79598°E	21300000015220
	Vaisaluokta kyrkkåta	Jokkmokks kronoöverloppsmark 17:1	5			67.67609°N 17.26685°E	21300000016688

== Kalix Municipality ==
Image	Name	Premises	Number of buildings	Year built	Architect	Coordinates	ID
	Englundsgården	Kalix 6:29 previously stadsägorna 317, 318	7			65.84017°N 23.18545°E	21300000014999
	Malörens fyrplats	Malören 1:1	1			65.52808°N 23.55698°E	21300000015003

== Kiruna Municipality ==
Image	Name	Premises	Number of buildings	Year built	Architect	Coordinates	ID
	Abisko östra station	Jukkasjärvi bandel 100:18 previously 100:1	2			68.34926°N 18.82929°E	21300000015223
	Hjalmar Lundbohmsgården	Fjällrosen 1); HJALMAR LUNDBOHMSGÅRDEN	3			67.84764°N 20.22283°E	21300000015018
	Hyresfastigheten "Jerusalem"	Bolaget 11:1	1			67.84579°N 20.23221°E	21300000015020
	Kiruna järnvägsstation	Jukkasjärvi bandel 100:1 previously Jukkasjärvi bandel 1:1	1			67.85492°N 20.21580°E	21300000015013
	Kiruna stadshus	Tätörten 3	1			67.85256°N 20.22233°E	21300000015009
	Malmbanan	Jukkasjärvi bandel 100:1 (del av	17			68.34829°N 18.93971°E	21300000024524

== Luleå Municipality ==
Image	Name	Premises	Number of buildings	Year built	Architect	Coordinates	ID
	Länsresidenset, Luleå	Kungsfågeln 3	4			65.58250°N 22.13441°E	21300000015150
	Bergströmska gården	Sparven 6, 16	5			65.58239°N 22.14445°E	21300000015087
	Fd. Fängelset Vita Duvan	Biet 1 previously Kungsfågeln 3	1			65.58096°N 22.13447°E	21300000015117
	Gamla Hamnkranen	Innerstaden 2:1	1			65.57978°N 22.15224°E	21000001686341
	Karlshälls massamagasinen	Karlsvik 1:1	2			65.60659°N 22.06933°E	21300000015155
	Pontusbadet	Bävern 1	2			65.58889°N 22.14973°E	21300000015121
	Rödkallens fyr, fyrvaktarbostad	Rödkallen 2:1	4			65.31755°N 22.36113°E	21300000015163

== Pajala Municipality ==
Image	Name	Premises	Number of buildings	Year built	Architect	Coordinates	ID
	Laestadiusmuseet	Pajala 14:49	2			67.21069°N 23.37928°E	21000001705921

== Piteå Municipality ==
Image	Name	Premises	Number of buildings	Year built	Architect	Coordinates	ID
	Fd. Rådhuset i Piteå	Stadsvapnet 6	1			65.31614°N 21.48301°E	21300000015175
	Järnvägsbron över Piteälven vid Sikfors	Sikfors 100:8	1			65.53444°N 21.21035°E	21300000024811
	Jävre turiststation	Jävre 52:1	1			65.14210°N 21.50537°E	21300000015167
	Sikfors kraftverk	Sikfors 3:31); SIKFORS GAMLA KRAFTSTATION	2			65.52958°N 21.20864°E	21000001631861

== Älvsbyn Municipality ==
Image	Name	Premises	Number of buildings	Year built	Architect	Coordinates	ID
	Jägmästarkontoret i Älvsbyn	Skogen 1	1			65.67023°N 21.01370°E	21300000015185

== Överkalix Municipality ==
Image	Name	Premises	Number of buildings	Year built	Architect	Coordinates	ID
	Martingården	Nybyn 4:9	9			66.36845°N 22.84151°E	21300000015198
	Rikti-Dockas nybygge	Törefors 3:3	9			66.42068°N 22.01779°E	21300000015204

== Övertorneå Municipality ==
Image	Name	Premises	Number of buildings	Year built	Architect	Coordinates	ID
	Biografen Röda Kvarn, Övertorneå	Matarengi 11:16	1			66.38855°N 23.65833°E	21300000015214
