= Svartbyn =

- Location within Norrbotten Location within Sweden
- Coordinates: 66°16′N 22°50′E
- Country: Sweden
- Province: Norrbotten
- County: Norrbotten County
- Municipality: Överkalix Municipality

Area
  - Total: 1.22 km^{2} (0.47 sq mi)

Population (31 December 2010)
  - Total: 265
  - Density: 218/km^{2} (560/sq mi)
- Time zone: UTC+1 (CET)
  - Summer (DST): UTC+2 (CEST)

Svartbyn is a locality situated in Överkalix Municipality, Norrbotten County, Sweden with 265 inhabitants in 2010.
