= Contribution of epigenetic modifications to evolution =

Epigenetics is the study of changes in gene expression that occur via mechanisms such as DNA methylation, histone acetylation, and microRNA modification. When these epigenetic changes are heritable, they can influence evolution. Current research indicates that epigenetics has played a role in the evolution of a number of organisms, including plants and animals.

== In plants ==
=== Overview ===
DNA methylation is a process by which methyl groups are added to the DNA molecule. Methylation can change the activity of a DNA segment without changing the sequence. Histones are proteins found in cell nuclei that package and order the DNA into structural units called nucleosomes.

DNA methylation and histone modification are two mechanisms used to regulate gene expression in most organisms which includes plants and animals. DNA methylation can be stable during cell division, allowing for methylation states to be passed to other orthologous genes in a genome. DNA methylation can be reversed via enzymes known as DNA de-methylases, while histone modifications can be reversed by removing histone acetyl groups with deacetylases. The process of DNA methylation reversal is known DNA demethylation. Interspecific differences due to environmental factors are shown to be associated with the difference between annual and perennial life cycles. There can be varying adaptive responses based on this.

=== Arabidopsis thaliana ===
Forms of histone methylation cause repression of certain genes that are stably inherited through mitosis but that can also be erased during meiosis or with the progression of time. The induction of flowering by exposure to low winter temperatures in Arabidopsis thaliana shows this effect. Histone methylation participates in repression of expression of an inhibitor of flowering during cold. In annual, semelparous species such as Arabidopsis thaliana, this histone methylation is stably inherited through mitosis after return from cold to warm temperatures giving the plant the opportunity to flower continuously during spring and summer until it senesces. However, in perennial, iteroparous relatives the histone modification rapidly disappears when temperatures rise, allowing expression of the floral inhibitor to increase and limiting flowering to a short interval. Epigenetic histone modifications control a key adaptive trait in Arabidopsis thaliana, and their pattern changes rapidly during evolution associated with reproductive strategy.

Another study tested several epigenetic recombinant inbred lines (epiRILs) of Arabidopsis thaliana - lines with similar genomes but varying levels of DNA methylation - for their drought sensitivity and their sensitivity to nutritional stress. It was found that there was a significant amount of heritable variation in the lines in regards to traits important for survival from drought and nutrient stress. This study proved that variation in DNA methylation could result in heritable variation of ecologically important plant traits, such as root allocation, drought tolerance, and nutrient plasticity. It also hinted that epigenetic variation alone could result in rapid evolution.

=== Dandelions ===
Scientists found that changes in DNA methylation induced by stress were inherited in asexual dandelions. Genetically similar plants were exposed to different ecological stresses, and their offspring were raised in an unstressed environment. Amplified fragment-length polymorphism markers that were methylation-sensitive were used to test for methylation on a genome-wide scale. It was found that many of the environmental stresses caused induction of pathogen and herbivore defenses, which caused methylation in the genome. These modifications were then genetically transmitted to the offspring dandelions. The transgenerational inheritance of a stress response can contribute to the heritable plasticity of the organism, allowing it to better survive environmental stresses. It also helps add to the genetic variation of specific lineages with little variability, giving a greater chance of reproductive success.

== In animals ==
=== Primates ===
A comparative analysis of CpG methylation patterns between humans and primates found that there were more than 800 genes that varied in their methylation patterns among orangutans, gorillas, chimpanzees, and bonobos. Despite these apes having the same genes, methylation differences are what accounts for their phenotypic variation. The genes in question are involved in development. It is not the protein sequences that account for the differences in physical characteristics between humans and apes; rather, it is the epigenetic changes to the genes. Since humans and the great apes share 99% of their DNA, it is thought that the differences in methylation patterns account for their distinction. So far, there are known to be 171 genes that are uniquely methylated in humans, 101 genes that are uniquely methylated in chimpanzees, 101 genes that are uniquely methylated in gorillas, and 450 genes that are uniquely methylated in orangutans. For example, genes involved in blood pressure regulation and the development of the inner ear's semicircular canal are highly methylated in humans, but not in apes. There are also 184 genes that are conserved at the protein level between humans and chimpanzees, but have epigenetic differences. Enrichments in multiple independent gene categories show that regulatory changes to these genes have given humans their specific traits. This research shows that epigenetics plays an important role in the evolution of primates. It has also been shown that cis-regulatory elements changes affect the transcription start sites (TSS) of genes. 471 DNA sequences are found to be enriched or depleted in regards to histone trimethylation at the H3K4 histone in chimpanzee, human, and macaque prefrontal cortexes. Among these sequences, 33 are selectively methylated in neuronal chromatin from children and adults, but not from non-neuronal chromatin. One locus that was selectively methylated was DPP10, a regulatory sequence that showed evidence of hominid adaptation, such as higher nucleotide substitution rates and certain regulatory sequences that were missing in other primates. Epigenetic regulation of TSS chromatin has been identified as an important development in the evolution of gene expression networks in the human brain. These networks are thought to play a role in cognitive processes and neurological disorders. An analysis of methylation profiles of humans and primate sperm cells reveals epigenetic regulation plays an important role here as well. Since mammalian cells undergo reprogramming of DNA methylation patterns during germ cell development, the methylomes of human and chimp sperm can be compared to methylation in embryonic stem cells (ESCs). There were many hypomethylated regions in both sperms cells and ESCs that showed structural differences. Also, many of the promoters in human and chimp sperm cells had different amounts of methylation. In essence, DNA methylation patterns differ between germ cells and somatic cells as well as between human and chimpanzee sperm cells. Meaning, differences in promoter methylation could possibly account for the phenotypic differences between humans and primates. Research has also shown surprisingly amounts of conserved tissue-specific methylation, in line with phylogenetic relatedness

=== Chickens ===
Red Junglefowl, an ancestor of domestic chickens, show that gene expression and methylation profiles in the thalamus and hypothalamus differed significantly from that of a domesticated egg-laying breed. Methylation differences and gene expression were maintained in the offspring, depicting that epigenetic variation is inherited. Some of the inherited methylation differences were specific to certain tissues, and the differential methylation at specific loci was not altered much after intercrossing between Red Junglefowl and domesticated laying hens for eight generations. The results hint that domestication has led to epigenetic changes, as domesticated chickens maintained a higher level of methylation for more than 70% of the genes.

== Role in evolution ==
The role of epigenetics in evolution is clearly linked to the selective pressures that regulate that process. As organisms leave offspring that are best suited to their environment, environmental stresses change DNA gene expression that is further passed down to their offspring, allowing for them also to better thrive in their environment. The classic case study of the rats who experience licking and grooming from their mothers pass this trait to their offspring shows that a mutation in the DNA sequence is not required for a heritable change. Basically, a high degree of maternal nurturing makes the offspring of that mother more likely to nurture their own children with a high degree of care as well. Rats with a lower degree of maternal nurturing are less likely to nurture their own offspring with so much care. Also, rates of epigenetic mutations, such as DNA methylation, are much higher than rates of mutations transmitted genetically and are easily reversed. This provides a way for variation within a species to rapidly increase, in times of stress, providing opportunity for adaptation to newly arising selection pressures.

== Lamarckism ==
Lamarckism supposes that species acquire characteristics to deal with challenges experienced during their lifetimes, and that such accumulations are then passed to their offspring. In modern terms, this transmission from parent to offspring could be considered a method of epigenetic inheritance. Scientists are now questioning the framework of the modern synthesis, as epigenetics to some extent is Lamarckist rather than Darwinian. While some evolutionary biologists have dismissed epigenetics' impact on evolution entirely, others are exploring a fusion of epigenetic and traditional genetic inheritance.

== See also ==
- Transgenerational epigenetic inheritance
