= Epigenetic priming =

Type of modification to a cell's epigenome

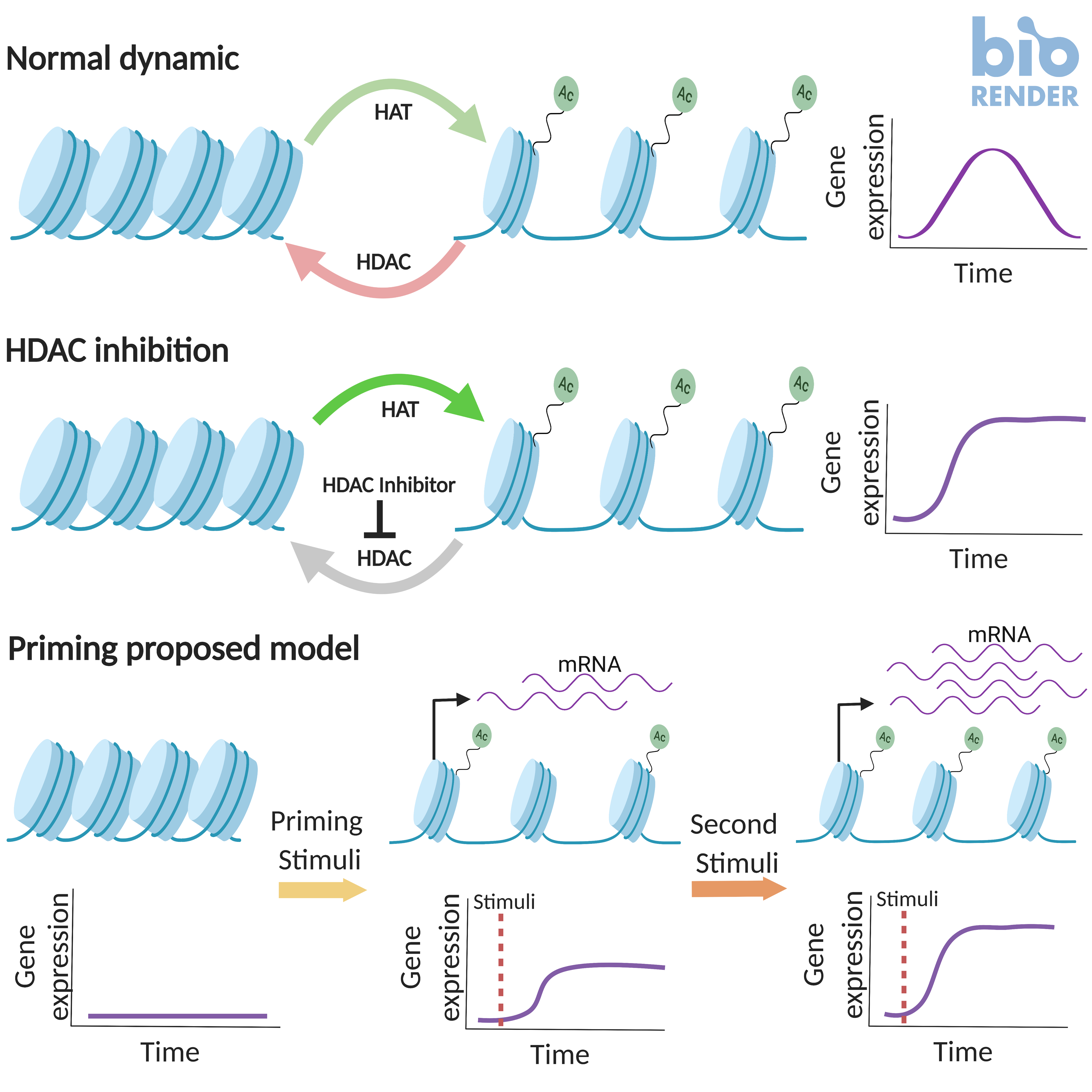
Top: Normal dynamic of histone acetylation leads to open and closed chromatin genome-wide and changes in gene expression.; Middle: HDAC inhibition repressed the closed-open change favoring an open chromatin state and gene expression.; Bottom: Epigenetic priming general model. Starting with an hypothetical closed chromatin state a priming stimuli sensitizes the chromatin to other stimuli and subsequently increase transcription.

Epigenetic priming (also known as gene priming) is the modification to a cell's epigenome whereby specific chromatin domains within a cell are converted from a closed state to an open state, usually as the result of an external biological trigger or pathway, allowing for DNA access by transcription factors or other modification mechanisms. The action of epigenetic priming for a certain region of DNA dictates how other gene regulation mechanisms will be able to act on the DNA later in the cell's life. Epigenetic priming has been chiefly investigated in neuroscience and cancer research, as it has been found to play a key role in memory formation within neurons and tumor-suppressor gene activation in cancer treatment respectively.

== Mechanism ==
Epigenetic priming refers to a latent epigenetic state triggered by stimuli, such as a drug or environmental changes. The epigenetically primed state is characterized by chromatin loosening, which is the change of chromatin state from heterochromatin (tightly bound and inaccessible) to euchromatin (loosely bound and fully accessible), which leads to an increased transcription of certain genes as a result of the easier access and binding of transcription factors. The triggering signal is effectuated by various epigenetic mechanisms, the most prominent of which are histone acetylation and histone methylation. Most of the epigenetic agents involved in histone modifications, such as histone deacetylase (HDAC) variants, are non-targeted, meaning the loosening and tightening of the chromatin is unspecific within the cell. Therefore, epigenetic priming and resultant gene transcription occurs throughout the cell and affects a large variety of chromatin sites.

Chromatin remodeling processes such as histone acetylation and methylation are reversible, and euchromatin sites resulting from epigenetic priming are eventually converted back to heterochromatin by reversal agents such as histone deacetylase. Thus, priming may be artificially controlled by inhibiting these reversal agents within the cell so that the chromatin remains open. Among these approaches, the most well studied is HDAC inhibition.

=== HDAC inhibition ===
In order to maintain the epigenome plasticity, enzymes that add (writers) and remove (erasers) the different epigenetic marks are needed. As exemplified by histone acetylation in the Epigenetic Priming Model figure above, there is an interplay between these writers and erasers that allows the genome to be responsive to external or internal stimuli. In the case of acetylation, histone acetyltransferases add acetyl groups to the histones and histone deacetylases (HDAC) remove them. Both are present within a cell at a given time, meaning that an acetylated (open) region of chromatin might be reverted to closed form. HDAC inhibition ensures that chromatin is left in an open state by prohibiting the open to closed transition, leading to lasting gene expression and other epigenetic activity.

== Cancer ==
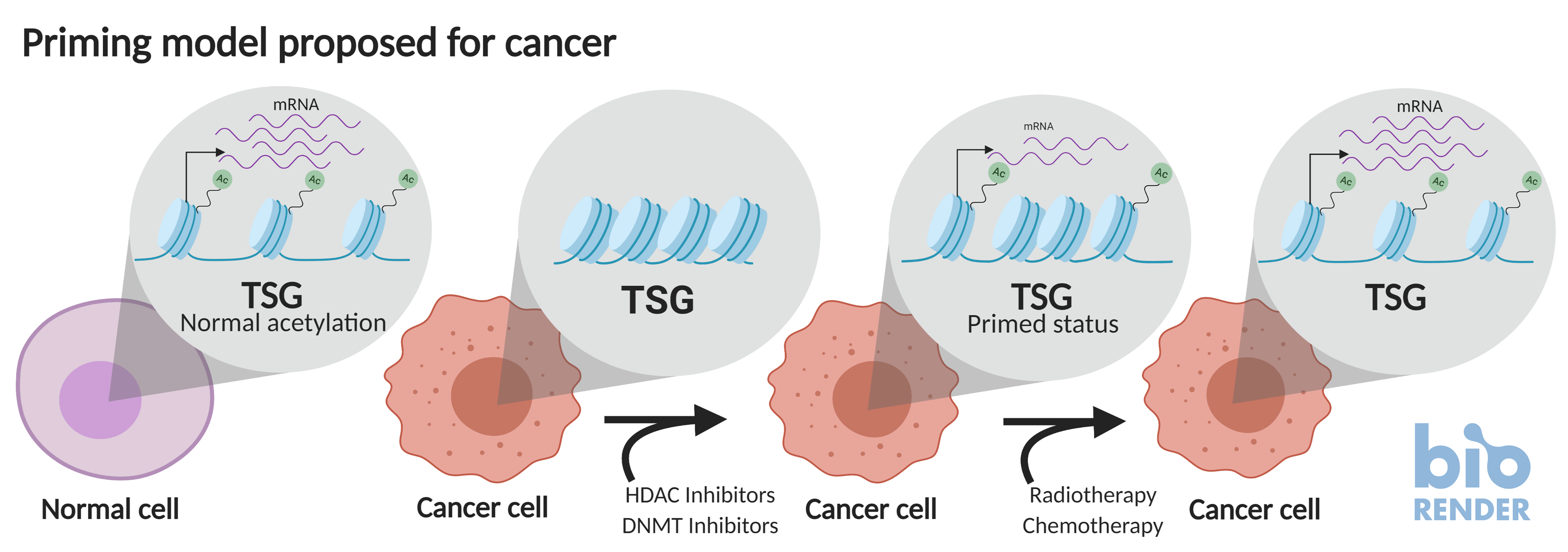
Cancer cell sensitization to treatment through epigenetic priming. Normal cells with activated tumor suppressor genes (TSG) and Cancer cell with inactivated TSG through epigenetic mechanisms (showing only acetylation for simplification purposes). Priming stimuli performed with DNMT and/or HDAC inhibitors following by immunotherapy treatment (second stimuli) leading to reactivation of TSG.

Epigenetic priming was first described in cancer research when epigenetic alterations on tumor-suppressor genes (TSG) were found to be drivers of carcinogenesis. Epigenetic alterations (e.g. DNA methylation) resulting in TSG inactivation as a common means of tumor formation. Contrary to regular DNA mutations common in cancer, methylation is reversible, provided that the chromatin is adequately open to allow hypomethylating agents to access the DNA and prevent methylation. Therefore, priming was investigated as a 'pre-treatment' to sensitize the tumorigenic cells to hypomethylating chemotherapeutics such as decitabine. Many types of cancer (e.g. gastric) are known for having aberrant epigenetic changes, particularly in DNA methylation. In contrast to DNA mutations which cannot be easily changed through treatment, these aberrant epigenetic changes allow for a reversible treatment avenue.

Epigenetic agents have proved to increase expression of aberrantly silenced genes (i.e. Runx3, Tnf, Pycard, Fas) in mice models after 5-aza-CR treatment . Thus, helping overcome cancer-induced cell dysfunction. Additionally, epigenetic priming has been shown to enhance cytotoxicity of cancer drugs (i.e. SN38 and CDDP), showing promising results in lung and ovarian cancer. Due to their proven effectivity, the FDA approved 5-azacytidine, romidepsin and other DMNT inhibitors (i.e. 5-azacytidine, hydralazine, 5-Aza-2'-deoxycytidine) and HDAC inhibitors (i.e. romidepsin, belinostat, panobinostat) for clinical use .

=== Clinical Trials ===
Several clinical trials have been performed to assess the safety and effectivity of epigenetic therapy as a pretreatment in cancer therapy. Preclinical usage of epigenetic agents like 5-azacytidine (DNMT inhibitor) and romidepsin (HDAC inhibitor) sensitizes cancer cells for further treatment. Some examples of clinical trials performed are listed below.

==== Colorectal cancer ====
Epigenetic treatment with 5-azacytidine (5-AZA) and romidepsin before pembrolizumab administration was tested for safety in a clinical trial from 2016 - 2018. Drug administration (5-AZA, romidepsin, 5-AZA + romidepsin) was followed for 14 days in 24 patients between 40–69 years old. Side effects in groups included diarrhea, nausea and fatigue. Moreover, lack of appetite, anemia and thrombocytopenia were independent of the drug combination received by the patient. After this study, epigenetic agent 'pretherapy' with 5-AZA and romidepsin followed by pembrolizumab treatment was deemed feasible and overall safe for patients.

==== Gastric carcinomas ====
Gastric cancer is heavily influenced by epigenetic aberrations. Analysis showed that DNA methylation changes have a higher influence on gastric cancer than point mutations. A phase I study on gastric cancer 5-AZA pretreatment in combination with epirubicin, oxaliplatin and capecitabine was successful. The epigenetic intervention was fruitful in demethylating loci (i.e. CDKN2A, ESR1, HPP1, MGMT, TIMP3) abnormally methylated in gastric carcinomas.

==== Acute myelogenous leukemia ====
A phase I study explored the feasibility of epigenetic priming with decitabine in patients with Acute Myelogenous Leukemia (AML) followed by cytarabine and daunorubicin treatment. Patients were treated two weeks before the immunotherapy either with 1 hour infusion (group A) or continuous infusion for 3, or 7 days (group B). Group B showed higher levels of hypomethylation after treatment than group A, but neither showed toxicity by the epigenetic agent. Finally, no significant side effects were encountered.

Older patients with AML diagnosis have poor prognosis, lower rates of complete remission and worsening of overall survival. A phase 2 study was performed evaluating the efficacy and safety of epigenetic priming through decitabine in elderly patients with AML. In 2015, 46 patients who were not candidates for intensive chemotherapy enrolled in the study. Treatment consisted of continuous IV administration of decitabine, followed by 5 days of cytarabine immunotherapy. Patients continued with a second cycle if evidence of disease was found on 15 day bone marrow biopsy, otherwise, they proceeded with decitabine maintenance. The study showed that pretreatment with decitabine followed by cytarabine promoted a higher number of complete remissions (70%) in older patients with AML.

== Neuroscience ==
It is believed that epigenetic modifications, and in particular those which perform epigenetic priming, are fundamentally responsible for the encoding of memory within neurons. This idea is supported by various pieces of evidence. Firstly, despite inhibition of protein synthesis during memory formation, memories may be retrieved later on. This, along with the discovery that long-term memory can be restored after synapse deterioration, suggests synaptic structuring (which requires protein synthesis during memory formation) is not the fundamental source of engram encoding within a cell. Furthermore, in mice it has been found that proper histone acetyltransferase function is required for memory formation and that HDAC inhibition in neurons can improve learning behavior and long-term memory. An explanation is that, when present in combination with memory-associated neural activity, HDAC inhibitors (HDACi) allow chromatin to remain open and increase transcription of genes that remodel synapses, resulting in increased plasticity and improved memory formation. As a result of these observations, it has been proposed that epigenetic priming is the initial phase of memory formation.

It has been found that different forms of long-term memory are associated with different types of histone acetylation, such as acetylation of H3 versus H4. This suggests that epigenetic priming in neurons which result in different memory profile expressions may be encoded by different histone acetyltransferases. Thus, although the mechanisms that loosen chromatin are unspecific in their target, likely have specificity depending on which ones are activated. In a similar vein, it is believed that the action of different of priming agents, such as the varieties of histone acetyltransferases, may combine to create a stacking effect on neuron chromatin, resulting in significantly increased expression of the associated genes.

== Metabolic syndrome ==
Epidemiological and experimental studies have shown that environmental factors during early development, such as maternal nutrition and body composition, can influence the metabolic phenotype of the offspring. Epigenetic priming is thought to mediate the persistent changes in gene expression that could eventually lead to metabolic syndrome. Potentially, these induced metabolic disruptions benefit progeny developing in a low resources environment to increased success later in life. The Agouti mouse exemplifies a variation of the aforementioned effect of early environmental exposures on offspring's fitness.
