= Transgenerational epigenetic inheritance in plants =

Overview article

Transgenerational epigenetic inheritance in plants involves mechanisms for the passing of epigenetic marks from parent to offspring that differ from those reported in animals. There are several kinds of epigenetic markers, but they all provide a mechanism to facilitate greater phenotypic plasticity by influencing the expression of genes without altering the DNA code. These modifications represent responses to environmental input and are reversible changes to gene expression patterns that can be passed down through generations. In plants, transgenerational epigenetic inheritance could potentially represent an evolutionary adaptation for sessile organisms to quickly adapt to their changing environment.

In eukaryotes, negatively charged DNA is wrapped extremely tightly around positively charged proteins, called histones, to form chromatin. Since the DNA is wrapped so tightly, it is inaccessible to transcription enzymes that function to copy the DNA into RNA (See: Central dogma of molecular biology). The inaccessible DNA must be unwound to be transcribed into RNA. The mechanism by which the DNA can be unwound is called chromatin remodeling. Chromatin remodeling is one apparatus through which epigenetics acts.

== Mechanisms ==
There are three mechanisms of chromatin remodeling that are well-supported by research:

- DNA methylation
- Histone modification
- Chromatin remodeling complexes

=== DNA methylation ===
DNA methylation refers to the addition of a methyl group (CH_{3}) to a cytosine (C) nucleotide in DNA. In plants, methylation occurs in every cytosine sequence context (CG, CHG and CHH where H represents either A, T, or C). The addition of a methyl group to a C nucleotide manipulates DNA expression patterns by changing the availability of genes for transcription. DNA methylation has also been shown to prevent disruption in the DNA sequence by repressing transposable elements.

DNA methylation patterns in plants are more complex than in animals and these patterns must be maintained to ensure their successful transfer to progeny. There are three pathways for maintenance of DNA methylation patterns in plants: the maintenance of CG by the enzyme MET1 (DNA Methyltransferase 1), the CMT3/SUVH pathway, and the RNA-dependent DNA methylation pathway (RdDM).

The first is the maintenance of CG by MET1. In plants, CG methylation is the most common context in which DNA methylation appears, and it is faced with the most scrutiny during maintenance. After DNA replication, the previously methylated CG sites become hemi-methylated – the term given to the asymmetric status of a newly synthesized strand of DNA in which the parent strand is methylated and the daughter strand is not. MET1 is recruited to the site of hemi-methylated CG and, with the help of enzymes, copies the methylation of the parent strand onto the daughter strand.

The second pathway – called the CMT3/SUVH pathway – methylates CHG contexts using the enzyme CMT3 (Chromomethylase 3) in conjunction with the histone H3K9me which is maintained by enzymes called SUVH histone methyltransferases (Mtases). The SUVH enzymes contain a binding domain for methylated cytosines and CMT3 has a binding domain for H3K9me. The existence of these binding domains suggests that among DNA methylation and H3K9me, a self-reinforcing loop – a metabolic cycle – maintains the repression of transposable elements and repeats.

The third pathway for maintenance of DNA methylation patterns in plants is a pathway called RNA-dependent DNA Methylation (RdDM). The enzyme CMT2 maintains cytosine methylation in CHH sequence contexts. The methylation of CHH is asymmetric, meaning that the normal degradation of methylation that occurs during DNA replication will be maintained and the methylation will be lost in one daughter strand.

Although these three pathways are distinct, there is cross-talk among them. Some non-CG contexts require MET1 and some CHH contexts require the CMT3/SUVH pathway.

Demethylation is the removal of methyl groups from DNA. Plants are unique in their use of active DNA demethylation. They use the Base Excision Repair (BER) pathway to remove methylated cytosines and replace them with unmodified ones. Glycosylases catalyze the removal of the single methylated cytosines and DNA repair enzymes clean the ends and add new cytosines.

=== Histone modification ===
Histone modification refers to the addition or subtraction of certain chemical groups from the amino acids of histones that change transcription activity by initiating a change in the structure of the chromatin or by recruiting transcription enzymes. Mediation of chromatin occurs most frequently through post-translational modifications like methylation, acetylation, ubiquitination, and phosphorylation, which are the main histone modifications occurring in plants. Usually, the addition of a histone modification increases transcription by neutralizing the positive charge of the histones and, thereby, unwinding the negatively charged DNA. Histone writers, readers, and erasers are the regulatory machinery that recognize and modify the histone modifications. Writers add, erasers remove, and readers recognize the post-translational modifications of histones. Each writer, reader and eraser is further subdivided based on the type of post-translational modification they act on or recognize.

=== Chromatin-remodeling complexes ===
Chromatin-remodeling complexes are protein complexes that change the composition of and interactions among nucleosomes, thus changing chromatin structure and DNA expression patterns. These ATP-dependent protein complexes are divided into four subfamilies: the SWI/SNF Subfamily, the Imitation Switch (ISWI) Subfamily, the Chromodomain Helicase DNA-Binding (CHD) Subfamily, and the Inositol Requiring 80 (INO80) Subfamily. SWI/SNF chromatin remodelers work to promote transcription by ejecting nucleosomes at specific positions on the chromosome but they are thought to have a minimal role in eukaryotic chromatin structure. ISWI Subfamily remodelers inhibit transcription by regulating the spacing of nucleosomes. CDH Subfamily remodelers are very diverse and vary in their structure and function. Some CDH subfamily remodelers repress transcription while others promote it. Lastly, INO80 Subfamily remodelers are highly conserved meaning that they have similar structures and functions across many species. Not only do they function to promote transcription, INO80s also play a role in DNA double-strand break repair.

== Evolutionary perspective ==
Plants are immobile, so they are under especially strong pressure to adapt quickly and effectively to their environment. Seed dormancy and germination is an example of a plant function that is heavily mediated by epigenetics – by histone modification. When histones are deacetylated, the transcription of photosynthesis genes is 'turned off' and germination is arrested. Stressful events like drought, exposure to UV radiation, cold, and pathogens have been seen to trigger a heritable increase in the frequency of recombination. The increase in recombination frequency allows for an increase in genetic variation. The more variation within a population, the greater the possibility that a well-adapted genotype will arise for selection to act on during stress-inducing environmental conditions.

DNA methylation is a refined regulator of gene expression; controlling which genes to express and how much to express them. Consequently, phenotypes induced by methylation are continuous, rather than being discrete. For example, crosses of wildtype and methylated mutant Linaria vulgaris plants resulted in offspring that varied in their methylation of the gene controlling floral symmetry: Lcyc. By proxy, their expression of Lcyc was varied and their floral symmetry phenotypes were a continuous distribution ranging from radially symmetrical to bilaterally symmetrical and anywhere in between. Cubas et al.'s (1999) experiment characterized the first natural morphological mutant. This mutation of the Lcyc gene in Linaria vulgaris causes the flower to become radially symmetrical as opposed to bilaterally symmetrical. The authors found that, in the mutant, Lcyc is highly methylated which prohibits the transcription of the gene; effectively silencing it. Consequently, in wildtypes, growth of the dorsal stamen (the male organ of the flower) is arrested early-on in its development but, in mutants, the development of the dorsal stamen persists. Additionally, the dorsal petal develops similarly to neighboring petals in mutants, but in wildtypes, the dorsal petal is unique. The naturally occurring methylation of Lcyc was found to be heritable and reversible.

An influential experiment by Jacobsen and Meyerowitz (1997) characterized seven epigenetic alleles (epialleles) of the SUPERMAN (SUP) gene in Arabidopsis thaliana. These seven epialleles are referred to as the clark kent alleles (clk 1-7) and they are associated with hypermethylation in SUP. The SUP gene controls flower development in Arabidopsis and the presence of a clk allele is correlated with an increase in the number of stamens and carpels (the female organ of the flower) in the first ten flowers of each plant. Additionally, the presence of clk alleles is associated with a reduction in SUP RNA expression which, in wild type plants, occurs within developing stamens during the establishment of floral meristems.

These examples of epigenetics in nature demonstrate the ability of epialleles to drastically influence phenotypes and increase genetic variability within populations. The stable heritability of epigenetic marks across generations suggests that resulting phenotypes would have substantial fitness effects and may respond, as DNA sequence variation does, to natural selection. The changes that epialleles induce can be quickly turned on and just as quickly degraded resulting in phenotypic plasticity. The heritability of epigenetic marks can serve as a generational memory to better prepare progeny for local environmental conditions.
