= Transgenerational epigenetic inheritance =

Epigenetic transmission without DNA primary structure alteration

"Intergenerational" vs "transgenerational" inheritance

Transgenerational epigenetic inheritance (TgEI) is the proposed transmission of epigenetic markers and modifications from one generation to multiple subsequent generations without altering the primary structure of DNA. Thus, the regulation of genes via epigenetic mechanisms can be heritable; the amount of transcripts and proteins produced can be altered by inherited epigenetic changes. In order for epigenetic marks to be heritable in animals, they must occur in the gametes, but since plants lack a definitive germline and can propagate, epigenetic marks in any tissue can be heritable.

The inheritance of epigenetic marks in the immediate generation is referred to as intergenerational inheritance. In male mice, the epigenetic signal is maintained through the F1 generation. The term "multigenerational inheritance" is applied to two distinct concepts in the literature: it functions as an overarching category encompassing both intergenerational (1–2 generations) and transgenerational (3+ generations) phenomena, and it also defines a specific inheritance model in which the parental generation and all successive offspring are directly exposed to an environmental factor. In female mice, the epigenetic signal is maintained through the F2 generation as a result of the exposure of the germline in the womb. Many epigenetic signals are lost beyond the F2/F3 generation and are no longer inherited, because the subsequent generations were not exposed to the same environment as the parental generations. The signals that are maintained beyond the F2/F3 generation are referred to as transgenerational epigenetic inheritance (TEI), because initial environmental stimuli resulted in inheritance of epigenetic modifications. There are several mechanisms of TEI that have shown to affect germline reprogramming, such as transgenerational increases in susceptibility to diseases, mutations, and stress inheritance. During germline reprogramming and early embryogenesis in mice, methylation marks are removed to allow for development to commence, but the methylation mark is converted into hydroxymethyl-cytosine so that it is recognized and methylated once that area of the genome is no longer being used, which serves as a memory for that TEI mark. Therefore, under lab conditions, inherited methyl marks are removed and restored to ensure TEI still occurs. However, observing TEI in wild populations is still in its infancy, as laboratory studies allow for more tractable systems.

Environmental factors can induce the epigenetic marks (epigenetic tags) for some epigenetically influenced traits. These can include, but are not limited to, changes in temperature, resource availability, exposure to pollutants, chemicals, and endocrine disruptors. The dosage and exposure levels can affect the extent of the environmental factors' influence over the epigenome and its effect on later generations. The epigenetic marks can result in a wide range of effects, including minor phenotypic changes to complex diseases and disorders. The complex cell signaling pathways of multicellular organisms such as plants and humans can make understanding the mechanisms of this inherited process very difficult.

== Epigenetic categories ==
There are mechanisms by which environmental exposures induce epigenetic changes by affecting regulation and gene expression. Four general categories of epigenetic modification are known.

1. self-sustaining metabolic loops, in which an mRNA or protein product of a gene stimulates transcription of the gene; e.g. Wor1 gene in Candida albicans;
2. Structural templating: structures are replicated using a template or scaffold structure of the parent. This can include, but is not limited to, the orientation and architecture of cytoskeletal structures, cilia and flagella. Ciliates provide a good example of this type of modification. In an experiment Beisson and Sonneborn in 1985, it was demonstrated in Paramecium that if a section of cilia was removed and inverted, then the progeny of that Paramecium would also display the modified cilia structure for several generations. Another example is seen in prions, special proteins that are capable of changing the structure of normal proteins to match their own. The prions use themselves as a template and then edit the folding of normal proteins to match their own folding pattern. The changes in the protein folding results in an alteration in the normal protein's function. This transmission of programming can also alter the chromatin and histone of the DNA and can be passed through the cytosol from parent to offspring during meiosis.
3. Histone modifications in which the structure of chromatin and its transcriptional state is regulated. DNA is wrapped into a DNA–protein complex called chromatin in the nucleus of eukaryotic cells. Chromatin consists of DNA and nucleosomes that comes together to form a histone octamer. The N- and C- terminal of the histone proteins are post-translationally modified by the removal or addition of acetyl (acetylation), phosphate (phosphorylation), methyl (methylation), ubiquitin (ubiquitination), and ubiquitin-like modifier (SUMOylating) groups. Histone modifications can be transgenerational epigenetic signals. For example, histone H3K4 trimethylation (H34me3) and a network of lipid metabolic genes interact to increase the transcription response to TEI obesogenic effects. TEI can also be observed in Drosophila embryos through the exposure of heat stress over generations. The induced heat stress resulted in the phosphorylation of ATF-2 (dATF-2) which is required for heterochromatin assembly. This epigenetic event was maintained over multiple generations, but over time dATF-2 returned back to its normal state.
4. Non-coding and coding RNAs in which various classes of RNA is implicated in TEI through maternal stores of mRNA, translation of mRNA (miRNA), and small RNA strands interfering with transcription (piRNAs and siRNAs) via RNA interference pathways (RNAi). There has been an increase in studies reporting noncoding RNA contributions to TEI. For example, altered miRNA in early trauma mice. Early trauma mice with unpredictable maternal separation and maternal stress (MSUS) were used as a model to identify the effects of altered miRNA in sperm. In MSUS mice, behavior responses were affected, insulin levels, and blood glucose levels were decreased. Notably, these effects were more severe across the F2 and F3 generation. The expression of miRNA in MSUS mice was down regulated in the brain, serum, and sperm of the F1 generation. However, the miRNA was not altered in the sperm of the F2 generation, and the miRNAs were normal in the F3 generation. This provides supportive evidence that the initial alterations in miRNAs in sperm are transferred to epigenetic marks to maintain transmission. In C.elegans, starvation is induced in which survival is dependent on the mechanisms of the RNAi pathway, repression of microRNAs, and regulation of small RNAs. Thus, memorization of dietary history is inherited across generations.

== Inheritance of epigenetic marks ==
Although there are various forms of inheriting epigenetic markers, inheritance of epigenetic markers can be summarized as the dissemination of epigenetic information by means of the germline. Furthermore, epigenetic variation typically takes one of four general forms, though there are other forms that have yet to be elucidated. Currently, self-sustaining feedback loops, spatial templating, chromatin marking, and RNA-mediated pathways modify epigenes of individual cells. Epigenetic variation within multicellular organisms is either endogenous or exogenous. Endogenous is generated by cell–cell signaling (e.g. during cell differentiation early in development), while exogenous is a cellular response to environmental cues.

=== Removal vs. retention ===
In sexually reproducing organisms, much of the epigenetic modification within cells is reset during meiosis (e.g. marks at the FLC locus controlling plant vernalization), though some epigenetic responses have been shown to be conserved (e.g. transposon methylation in plants). Differential inheritance of epigenetic marks due to underlying maternal or paternal biases in removal or retention mechanisms may lead to the assignment of epigenetic causation to some parent of origin effects in animals and plants.

=== Reprogramming ===
In mammals, epigenetic marks are erased during two phases of the life cycle. Firstly just after fertilization and secondly, in the developing primordial germ cells, the precursors to future gametes. During fertilization the male and female gametes join in different cell cycle states and with different configuration of the genome. The epigenetic marks of the male are rapidly diluted. First, the protamines associated with male DNA are replaced with histones from the female's cytoplasm, most of which are acetylated due to either higher abundance of acetylated histones in the female's cytoplasm or through preferential binding of the male DNA to acetylated histones. Second, male DNA is systematically demethylated in many organisms, possibly through 5-hydroxymethylcytosine. However, some epigenetic marks, particularly maternal DNA methylation, can escape this reprogramming; leading to parental imprinting.

In the primordial germ cells (PGC) there is a more extensive erasure of epigenetic information. However, some rare sites can also evade erasure of DNA methylation. If epigenetic marks evade erasure during both zygotic and PGC reprogramming events, this could enable transgenerational epigenetic inheritance.

Recognition of the importance of epigenetic programming to the establishment and fixation of cell line identity during early embryogenesis has recently stimulated interest in artificial removal of epigenetic programming. Epigenetic manipulations may allow for restoration of totipotency in stem cells or cells more generally, thus generalizing regenerative medicine.

=== Retention ===
Cellular mechanisms may allow for co-transmission of some epigenetic marks. During replication, DNA polymerases working on the leading and lagging strands are coupled by the DNA processivity factor proliferating cell nuclear antigen (PCNA), which has also been implicated in patterning and strand crosstalk that allows for copy fidelity of epigenetic marks. Work on histone modification copy fidelity has remained in the model phase, but early efforts suggest that modifications of new histones are patterned on those of the old histones and that new and old histones randomly assort between the two daughter DNA strands. With respect to transfer to the next generation, many marks are removed as described above. Emerging studies are finding patterns of epigenetic conservation across generations. For instance, centromeric satellites resist demethylation. The mechanism responsible for this conservation is not known, though some evidence suggests that methylation of histones may contribute. Dysregulation of the promoter methylation timing associated with gene expression dysregulation in the embryo was also identified.

=== Decay ===
Whereas the mutation rate in a given 100-base gene may be 10^{−7} per generation, epigenes may "mutate" several times per generation or may be fixed for many generations. This raises the question: do changes in epigene frequencies constitute evolution? Rapidly decaying epigenetic effects on phenotypes (i.e. lasting less than three generations) may explain some of the residual variation in phenotypes after genotype and environment are accounted for. However, distinguishing these short-term effects from the effects of the maternal environment on early ontogeny remains a challenge.

=== Transient versus permanent inheritance ===
Transgenerational epigenetic inheritance can be delineated into two categories based on duration and evolutionary function: permanent and transient effects.

- Permanent transgenerational effects are maintained indefinitely and function primarily to epigenetically silence transposons, repetitive elements, and foreign DNA sequences integrated into the genome. Because they suppress stable genomic elements, these permanent modifications rarely evolve in response to dynamic environmental stimuli.
- Transient transgenerational effects are frequently induced by environmental stress and persist for a limited span, typically three to ten generations, before reverting. These transient responses are mediated by small RNAs, DNA methylation, and histone modifications. The reversion of transient effects is hypothesized to be an active process; for instance, resetting mechanisms involving H3K9 methylation and specific chromodomain proteins actively antagonize the inheritance of small RNA silencing in model organisms like C. elegans, preventing the transient environmental adaptation from becoming a permanent epigenetic fixture.

== Examples of TEI ==
The relative importance of genetic and epigenetic inheritance is subject to debate. Though hundreds of examples of epigenetic modification of phenotypes have been published, few studies have been conducted outside of the laboratory setting. Therefore, the interactions of genes with the environment cannot be inferred despite the central role of environment in natural selection. Multiple epigenetic factors can influence the state of genes and alter the epigenetic state. Due to the multivariate nature of environmental factors, it is difficult for researchers to pinpoint the exact cause of epigenetic changes outside of a laboratory setting.

=== In plants ===
Studies concerning transgenerational epigenetic inheritance in plants have been reported as early as the 1950s. One of the earliest and best characterized examples of this is b1 paramutation in maize. The b1 gene encodes a basic helix-loop-helix transcription factor that is involved in the anthocyanin production pathway. When the b1 gene is expressed, the plant accumulates anthocyanin within its tissues, leading to a purple coloration of those tissues. The B-I allele (for B-Intense) has high expression of b1 resulting in the dark pigmentation of the sheath and husk tissues while the B' (pronounced B-prime) allele has low expression of b1 resulting in low pigmentation in those tissues. When homozygous B-I parents are crossed to homozygous B', the resultant F1 offspring all display low pigmentation which is due to gene silencing of b1. Unexpectedly, when F1 plants are self-crossed, the resultant F2 generation all display low pigmentation and have low levels of b1 expression. Furthermore, when any F2 plant (including those that are genetically homozygous for B-I) are crossed to homozygous B-I, the offspring will all display low pigmentation and expression of b1. The lack of darkly pigmented individuals in the F2 progeny is an example of non-Mendelian inheritance and further research has suggested that the B-I allele is converted to B' via epigenetic mechanisms. The B' and B-I alleles are considered to be epialleles because they are identical at the DNA sequence level but differ in the level of DNA methylation, siRNA production, and chromosomal interactions within the nucleus. Additionally, plants defective in components of the RNA-directed DNA-methylation pathway show an increased expression of b1 in B' individuals similar to that of B-I, however, once these components are restored, the plant reverts to the low expression state. Although spontaneous conversion from B-I to B' has been observed, a reversion from B' to B-I (green to purple) has never been observed over 50 years and thousands of plants in both greenhouse and field experiments.

Examples of environmentally induced transgenerational epigenetic inheritance in plants has also been reported. In one case, rice plants that were exposed to drought-simulation treatments displayed increased tolerance to drought after 11 generations of exposure and propagation by single-seed descent as compared to non-drought treated plants. Differences in drought tolerance was linked to directional changes in DNA-methylation levels throughout the genome, suggesting that stress-induced heritable changes in DNA-methylation patterns may be important in adaptation to recurring stresses. In another study, plants that were exposed to moderate caterpillar herbivory over multiple generations displayed increased resistance to herbivory in subsequent generations (as measured by caterpillar dry mass) compared to plants lacking herbivore pressure. This increase in herbivore resistance persisted after a generation of growth without any herbivore exposure suggesting that the response was transmitted across generations. The report concluded that components of the RNA-directed DNA-methylation pathway are involved in the increased resistance across generations. Transgenerational epigenetic inheritance has also been observed in polyploid plants. Genetically identical reciprocal F1 hybrid triploids have been shown to display transgenerational epigenetic effects on viable F2 seed development.

It has been demonstrated in wild radish plants (Raphanus raphanistrum) that TEI can be induced when the plants are exposed to predators such as Pieris rapae, the cabbage white caterpillar. The radish plants will increase production of bristly leaf hairs and toxic mustard oil in response to caterpillar predation. The increased levels will also be seen in the next generation. Decreased levels of predation also results in decreased leaf hairs and toxins produced in the current and subsequent generations.

=== In animals ===
It is difficult to trace TEI in animals due to the reprogramming of genes during meiosis and embryogenesis, especially in wild populations that are not reared in a lab setting. Further studies must be conducted to strengthen the documentation of TEI in animals. However, a few examples do exist.

Induced transgenerational epigenetic inheritance has been demonstrated in animals, such as Daphnia cucullata. These tiny crustaceans will develop protective helmets as juveniles if exposed to kairomones, a type of hormone, secreted by predators while they are in utero. The helmet acts as a method of defense by decreasing the ability of predators to capture the Daphnia, thus induction of helmet presence will lower mortality rates. D. cucullata will develop a small helmet if no kairomones are present. However, depending upon the level of predator kairomones, the length of the helmet will almost double. The next generation of Daphnia will display a similar helmet size. If the kairomone levels decrease or disappear, then the third generation will revert to the original helmet size. These organisms display adaptive phenotypes that will affect the phenotype in the subsequent generations.

Genetic analysis of coral reef fish, Acanthochromis polyacanthus, has proposed TEI in response to climate change. As climate change occurs, the ocean water temperature increases. When A. polyacanthus is exposed to higher water temperatures of up to +3 °C from normal ocean temperatures, the fish express increased DNA methylation levels on 193 genes, resulting in phenotypic changes in the function of oxygen consumption, metabolism, insulin response, energy production, and angiogenesis. The increase in DNA methylation and its phenotypic affects were carried over to multiple subsequent generations.

Possible TEI has been studied in guinea pigs (Cavia aperea) by exposing males to increased ambient temperature for two months. In the lab, the males were allowed to mate with the same female before and after the heat exposure to determine if the high temperatures affected the offspring. Since it serves as a thermoregulatory organ, samples of the liver were studied in the father guinea pigs (F0 generation) and liver and testes of the male offspring (F1 generation). The F0 males experienced an immediate epigenetic response to the increase in temperature; the levels of hormones in the liver responsible for thermoregulation increased. The F1 generation also displayed the different methylated epigenetic response in their liver and testes, indicating that they could potentially pass on the epigenetic marks to the F2 generation.

==== In humans ====
Although genetic inheritance is important when describing phenotypic outcomes, it cannot entirely explain why offspring resemble their parents. Aside from genes, offspring come to inherit similar environmental conditions established by previous generations. One environment that human offspring commonly share with their maternal parent for nine months is the womb. Considering the duration of the fetal stages of development, the environment of the mother's womb can have long lasting effects on the health of offspring.

An example of how the environment within the womb can affect the health of an offspring is the Dutch hunger winter of 1944–45 and its causal effect on induced transgenerational epigenetic inherited diseases. During the Dutch hunger winter, the offspring exposed to famine conditions during the third trimester of development were smaller than those born the year before the famine. Moreover, the offspring born during the famine and their subsequent offspring were found to have an increased risk of metabolic diseases, cardiovascular diseases, glucose intolerance, diabetes, and obesity in adulthood. The effects of this famine on development lasted up to two generations. The increased risk factors to the health of F1 and F2 generations during the Dutch hunger winter is a known phenomenon called "fetal programming", which is caused by exposure to harmful environmental factors in utero.

The loss of genetic expression which results in Prader–Willi syndrome or Angelman syndrome has in some cases been found to be caused by epigenetic changes (or "epimutations") on both the alleles, rather than involving any genetic mutation. In all 19 informative cases, the epimutations that, together with physiological imprinting and therefore silencing of the other allele, were causing these syndromes were localized on a chromosome with a specific parental and grandparental origin. Specifically, the paternally derived chromosome carried an abnormal maternal mark at the SNURF-SNRPN, and this abnormal mark was inherited from the paternal grandmother.

Several cancers have been found to be influenced by transgenerational epigenetics. Epimutations on the MLH1 gene has been found in two individuals with a phenotype of hereditary nonpolyposis colorectal cancer, and without any frank MLH1 mutation which otherwise causes the disease. The same epimutations were also found on the spermatozoa of one of the individuals, indicating the potential to be transmitted to offspring. In addition to epimutations to the MLH1 gene, it has been determined that certain cancers, such as breast cancer, can originate during the fetal stages within the uterus. Furthermore, evidence collected in various studies utilizing model systems (i.e. animals) have found that exposure during parental generations can result in multigenerational and transgenerational inheritance of breast cancer. More recently, studies have discovered a connection between the adaptation of male germinal cells via pre-conception paternal diets and the regulation of breast cancer in developing offspring. More specifically, studies have begun to uncover new data that underscores a relationship between transgenerational epigenetic inheritance of breast cancer and ancestral alimentary components or associated markers, such as birth weight. By utilizing model systems, such as mice, studies have shown that stimulated paternal obesity at the time of conception can epigenetically alter the paternal germ-line. The paternal germ-line is responsible for regulating their daughters' weight at birth and the potential for their daughter to develop breast cancer. Furthermore, it was found that modifications to the miRNA expression profile of the male germline is coupled with elevated body weight. Additionally, paternal obesity resulted in an increase in the percentage of female offspring developing carcinogen-induced mammary tumors, which is caused by changes to mammary miRNA expression.

Aside from cancer related afflictions associated with the effects of transgenerational epigenetic inheritance, transgenerational epigenetic inheritance has recently been implicated in the progression of pulmonary arterial hypertension (PAH). Recent studies have found that transgenerational epigenetic inheritance is likely to be involved in the progression of PAH because current therapies for PAH do not repair the irregular phenotypes associated with this disease. Current treatments for PAH have attempted to correct symptoms of PAH with vasodilators and antithrombotic protectors, but neither has effectively alleviated the complications related to the impaired phenotypes associated with PAH. The inability of vasodilators and antithrombotic protectants to correct PAH suggests that the progression of PAH is dependent upon multiple variables, which is likely to be consequent of transgenerational epigenetic inheritance. Specifically, it is thought that transgenerational epigenetics is linked to the phenotypic changes associated with vascular remodeling. For example, hypoxia during gestation may induce transgenerational epigenetic alterations that could prove to be detrimental during the early phases of fetal development and increase the possibility of developing PAH as an adult. Though hypoxic states could induce the transgenerational epigenetic variance associated with PAH, there is strong evidence to support that a variety of maternal risk factors are linked to the eventual progression of PAH. Such maternal risk factors linked to late-onset PAH includes placental dysfunction, hypertension, obesity, and preeclampsia. These maternal risk factors and environmental stressors coupled with transgenerational epigenetic changes can result in prolonged insult to the signaling pathways associated with the vascular development during fetal stages, thus increasing the likelihood of having PAH.

One study has shown childhood abuse, which is defined as "sexual contact, severe physical abuse and/or severe neglect", leads to epigenetic modifications of glucocorticoid receptor expression. Glucocorticoid receptor expression plays a vital role in hypothalamic-pituitary-adrenal (HPA) activity. Additionally, animal experiments have shown that epigenetic changes can depend on mother–infant interactions after birth. Furthermore, a recent study investigating the correlations between maternal stress in pregnancy and methylation in teenagers/their mothers has found that children of women who were abused during pregnancy were more likely to have methylated glucocorticoid-receptor genes. Thus, children with methylated glucocorticoid-receptor genes experience an altered response to stress, ultimately leading to a higher susceptibility of experiencing anxiety.

A 2026 review evaluating the potential inheritance of post-traumatic stress disorder (PTSD) among populations exposed to war and genocide highlighted severe limitations in applying TEI to human behavioral cohorts. While multiple studies report variations in DNA methylation across stress-related genes (such as FKBP5, NR3C1, NR3C2, and BDNF) in parents and offspring exposed to trauma, the results remain inconsistent. The reviewers concluded that human observational studies cannot definitively establish genuine epigenetic inheritance or causality due to small sample sizes, cross-sectional designs, and an inability to adequately isolate biological transmission from shared psychosocial, environmental, and cultural confounders.

Additional studies examining the effects of diethylstilbestrol (DES), which is an endocrine disruptor, have found that the grandchildren (third-generation) of women exposed to DES significantly increased the probability of their grandchildren developing attention-deficit/hyperactivity disorder (ADHD). This is because women exposed to endocrine disruptors, such as DES, during gestation may be linked to multigenerational neurodevelopmental deficits. Furthermore, animal studies indicate that endocrine disruptors have a profound impact on germline cells and neurodevelopment. The cause of DES's multigenerational impact is postulated to be the result of biological processes associated with epigenetic reprogramming of the germline, though this has yet to be determined.

== Effects on fitness ==
Epigenetic inheritance may only affect fitness if it predictably alters a trait under selection. Evidence has been forwarded that environmental stimuli are important agents in the alteration of epigenes. Ironically, Darwinian evolution may act on these neo-Lamarckian acquired characteristics as well as the cellular mechanisms producing them (e.g. methyltransferase genes). Epigenetic inheritance may confer a fitness benefit to organisms that deal with environmental changes at intermediate timescales. Short-cycling changes are likely to have DNA-encoded regulatory processes, as the probability of the offspring needing to respond to changes multiple times during their lifespans is high. On the other end, natural selection will act on populations experiencing changes on longer-cycling environmental changes. In these cases, if epigenetic priming of the next generation is deleterious to fitness over most of the interval (e.g. misinformation about the environment), these genotypes and epigenotypes will be lost. For intermediate time cycles, the probability of the offspring encountering a similar environment is sufficiently high without substantial selective pressure on individuals lacking a genetic architecture capable of responding to the environment. Naturally, the absolute lengths of short, intermediate, and long environmental cycles will depend on the trait, the length of epigenetic memory, and the generation time of the organism. Much of the interpretation of epigenetic fitness effects centers on the hypothesis that epigenes are important contributors to phenotypes, which remains to be resolved.

=== Deleterious effects ===
Inherited epigenetic marks may be important for regulating important components of fitness. In plants, for instance, the Lcyc gene in Linaria vulgaris controls the symmetry of the flower. Linnaeus first described radially symmetric mutants, which arise when Lcyc is heavily methylated. Given the importance of floral shape to pollinators, methylation of Lcyc homologues (e.g. CYCLOIDEA) may have deleterious effects on plant fitness. In animals, numerous studies have shown that inherited epigenetic marks can increase susceptibility to disease. Transgenerational epigenetic influences are also suggested to contribute to disease, especially cancer, in humans. Tumor methylation patterns in gene promoters have been shown to correlate positively with familial history of cancer. Furthermore, methylation of the MSH2 gene is correlated with early-onset colorectal and endometrial cancers.

=== Putatively adaptive effects ===
Experimentally demethylated seeds of the model organism Arabidopsis thaliana have significantly higher mortality, stunted growth, delayed flowering, and lower fruit set, indicating that epigenes may increase fitness. Furthermore, environmentally induced epigenetic responses to stress have been shown to be inherited and positively correlated with fitness. In animals, communal nesting changes mouse behavior increasing parental care regimes and social abilities that are hypothesized to increase offspring survival and access to resources (such as food and mates), respectively.

=== Inheritance of Immunity ===
Epigenetics play a crucial role in regulation and development of the immune system. In 2021, evidence of inheritance of trained immunity across generations to progeny of mice with a systemic infection of Candida albicans was provided. The progeny of mice survived the Candida albicans infection via functional, transcriptional, and epigenetic changes linked to the immune gene loci. The responsiveness of myeloid cells to the Candida albicans infection increased in inflammatory pathways, and resistance was increased to infections in the next generations. Immunity in vertebrates can also be transferred from maternal through the passing of hormones, nutrients and antibodies. In mammals, the maternal factors can be transferred via lactation or the placenta. The transgenerational transmission of immune-related traits are also described in plants and invertebrates. Plants have a defense priming system which enables them to have an alternate defense response that can be accelerated upon exposure to stress actions or pathogens. After the event of priming, priming stress clue information is stored, and the memory may be inherited in the offspring (intergenerational or transgenerational). In studies, the progeny of Pseudomonas syringae infected Arabidopsis were primed during the expression of systemic acquired resistance (SAR). The progeny showed to have resistance against (hemi)-biotrophic pathogens which is associated with salicylic dependent genes and the defense regulatory gene, non expressor of PR genes (NPR1). Transgenerational SAR in the progeny was associated with increased acetylation of histone 3 at lysine 9, hypomethylation of genes, and chromatin marks on promoter regions of salicylic dependent genes. Similarly in insects, the red flour beetle Tribolium castaneum is primed through the exposure of the pathogen Bacillus thuringiensis. Double-mating experiments with the red flour beetle demonstrated that paternal transgenerational immune priming is mediated by sperm or seminal fluid which enhances survival upon exposure to pathogens and contribute to epigenetic changes.

==== Feedback loops and TEI ====
Positive and negative feedback loops are commonly observed in molecular mechanisms and regulation of homeostatic processes. There is evidence that feedback loops interact to maintain epigenetic modifications within one generation, as well as contributing to TEI in various organisms, and these feedback loops can showcase putative adaptations to environmental perturbances. Feedback loops are truly a repercussion of any epigenetic modification, since it results in changes in expression. Even more so, the feedback loops seen across multiple generations because of TEI showcases a spatio-temporal dynamic that is associated with TEI alone. For example, elevated temperatures during embryogenesis and PIWI RNA (piRNA) establishment are directly proportional, providing a heritable outcome for repressing transposable elements via piRNA clusters. Furthermore, subsequent generations retain an active locus to continue establishing piRNA, which its formation was previously enigmatic. In another case, it was suggested that endocrine disruption had a feedback loop interaction with methylation of varying genomic sites in Menidia beryllina, which may have been a function of TEI. When exposure was removed, and M. beryllina F2 offspring still retained these methylation marks, which caused a negative feedback loop on expression of various genes. In another example, hybridization of eels can lead to feedback loops contributing to transposon demethylation and transposable element activation. Because TE's are typically silenced in the genome, their presence and potential expression creates a feedback loop to prevent hybrids from reproducing with other hybrids or non-hybrid species, which eliminates the proliferation of TE expression and prevents TEI in this context. This phenomenon is known as a form of post-zygotic reproductive isolation.

== Macroevolutionary patterns ==
Inherited epigenetic effects on phenotypes have been well documented in bacteria, protists, fungi, plants, nematodes, and fruit flies. Though no systematic study of epigenetic inheritance has been conducted (most focus on model organisms), there is preliminary evidence that this mode of inheritance is more important in plants than in animals. The early differentiation of animal germlines is likely to preclude epigenetic marking occurring later in development, while in plants and fungi somatic cells may be incorporated into the germ line.

It is thought that transgenerational epigenetic inheritance can enable certain populations to readily adapt to variable environments. Though there are well documented cases of transgenerational epigenetic inheritance in certain populations, there are questions to whether this same form of adaptability is applicable to mammals. More specifically, it is questioned if it applies to humans. As of late, most of the experimental models utilizing mice and limited observations in humans have only found epigenetically inherited traits that are detrimental to the health of both organisms. These harmful traits range from increased risk of disease, such as cardiovascular disease, to premature death. However, this may be based on the premise of limited reporting bias because it is easier to detect negative experimental effects, opposed to positive experimental effects. Furthermore, considerable epigenetic reprogramming necessary for the evolutionary success of germlines and the initial phases of embryogenesis in mammals may be the potential cause limiting transgenerational inheritance of chromatin marks in mammals.

Life history patterns may also contribute to the occurrence of epigenetic inheritance. Sessile organisms, those with low dispersal capability, and those with simple behavior may benefit most from conveying information to their offspring via epigenetic pathways. Geographic patterns may also emerge, where highly variable and highly conserved environments might host fewer species with important epigenetic inheritance.

== History and controversy ==
Humans have long recognized that traits of the parents are often seen in offspring. This insight led to the practical application of selective breeding of plants and animals, but did not address the central question of inheritance: how are these traits conserved between generations, and what causes variation? Several positions have been held in the history of evolutionary thought.

=== Blending vs. particulate inheritance ===
Blending inheritance leads to the averaging out of every characteristic, which as the engineer Fleeming Jenkin pointed out, makes evolution by natural selection impossible.

Addressing these related questions, scientists during the time of the Enlightenment largely argued for the blending hypothesis, in which parental traits were homogenized in the offspring much like buckets of different colored paint being mixed together. Critics of Charles Darwin's On the Origin of Species, pointed out that under this scheme of inheritance, variation would quickly be swamped by the majority phenotype. In the paint bucket analogy, this would be seen by mixing two colors together and then mixing the resulting color with only one of the parent colors 20 times; the rare variant color would quickly fade.

Unknown to most of the European scientific community, the monk Gregor Mendel had resolved the question of how traits are conserved between generations through breeding experiments with pea plants by 1856. Charles Darwin thus did not know of Mendel's proposed "particulate inheritance" in which traits were not blended but passed to offspring in discrete units that we now call genes. Darwin came to reject the blending hypothesis even though his ideas and Mendel's were not unified until the 1930s, a period referred to as the modern synthesis.

=== Inheritance of innate vs. acquired characteristics ===
In his 1809 book, Philosophie Zoologique, Jean-Baptiste Lamarck recognized that each species experiences a unique set of challenges due to its form and environment. Thus, he proposed that the characters used most often would accumulate a "nervous fluid". Such acquired accumulations would then be transmitted to the individual's offspring. In modern terms, a nervous fluid transmitted to offspring would be a form of epigenetic inheritance.

Lamarckism, as this body of thought became known, was the standard explanation for change in species over time when Charles Darwin and Alfred Russel Wallace co-proposed a theory of evolution by natural selection in 1859. Responding to Darwin and Wallace's theory, a revised neo-Lamarckism attracted a small following of biologists, though the Lamarckian zeal was quenched in large part due to Weismann's famous experiment in which he cut off the tails of mice over several successive generations without having any effect on tail length. Thus the emergent consensus that acquired characteristics could not be inherited became canon.

=== Revision of evolutionary theory ===
Non-genetic variation and inheritance, however, proved to be quite common. Concurrent with the 20th-century development of the modern evolutionary synthesis (unifying Mendelian genetics and natural selection), C. H. Waddington (1905–1975) was working to unify developmental biology and genetics. In so doing, he adopted the word "epigenetic" to represent the ordered differentiation of embryonic cells into functionally distinct cell types despite having identical primary structure of their DNA. Researchers discussed Waddington's epigenetics sporadically - it became more of a catch-all for puzzling non-genetic heritable characters rather than a concept advancing the body of inquiry. Consequently, the definition of Waddington's word has itself evolved, broadening beyond the subset of developmentally signaled, inherited cell specialization.

Some scientists have questioned whether epigenetic inheritance compromises the foundation of the modern synthesis. Outlining the central dogma of molecular biology, Francis Crick succinctly stated, "DNA is held in a configuration by histone[s] so that it can act as a passive template for the simultaneous synthesis of RNA and protein[s]. None of the detailed 'information' is in the histone." However, he closes the article stating, "this scheme explains the majority of the present experimental results!" Indeed, the emergence of epigenetic inheritance (in addition to advances in the study of evolutionary-development, phenotypic plasticity, evolvability, and systems biology) has strained the current framework of the modern evolutionary synthesis, and prompted the re-examination of previously dismissed evolutionary mechanisms.

Furthermore, patterns in epigenetic inheritance and the evolutionary implications of the epigenetic codes in living organisms are connected to both Lamarck's and Darwin's theories of evolution. For example, Lamarck postulated that environmental factors were responsible for modifying phenotypes hereditarily, which supports the constructs that exposure to environmental factors during critical stages of development can result in epimutations in germlines, thus augmenting phenotypic variance. In contrast, Darwin's theory claimed that natural selection strengthened a populations ability to survive and remain reproductively fit by favoring populations that are able to readily adapt. This theory is consistent with intergenerational plasticity and phenotypic variance resulting from heritable adaptivity.

In addition, some epigenetic variability may provide beneficial plasticity, so that certain organisms can adapt to fluctuating environmental conditions. However, the exchange of epigenetic information between generations can result in epigenetic aberrations, which are epigenetic traits that deviate from the norm. Therefore, the offspring of the parental generations may be predisposed to specific diseases and reduced plasticity due to epigenetic aberrations. Though the ability to readily adapt when faced with a new environment may be beneficial to certain populations of species that can quickly reproduce, species with long generational gaps may not benefit from such an ability. If a species with a longer generational gap does not appropriately adapt to the anticipated environment, then the reproductive fitness of the offspring of that species will be diminished.

There has been critical discussion of mainstream evolutionary theory by Edward J Steele, Robyn A Lindley and colleagues, Fred Hoyle and N. Chandra Wickramasinghe, Yongsheng Liu Denis Noble, John Mattick and others that the logical inconsistencies as well as Lamarckian Inheritance effects involving direct DNA modifications, as well as the just described indirect, viz. epigenetic, transmissions, challenge conventional thinking in evolutionary biology and adjacent fields.

=== Validation criteria and mammalian reprogramming ===
The verification of TEI in mammals remains highly controversial due to the confounding influences of the maternal uterine environment, postnatal care, and the dual waves of global epigenetic reprogramming (erasure) that occur during primordial germ cell specification and post-fertilization. Because these reprogramming events actively strip the majority of DNA methylation and histone modifications, establishing true germline transmission of an acquired trait requires overcoming significant methodological bottlenecks.

To resolve the lack of consensus, recent frameworks propose stringent multifactorial criteria to authenticate mammalian TEI. Methodologically, these criteria demand that a phenotype manifest in generations entirely free from direct exposure (≥F2 for paternal, ≥F3 for maternal) and that the corresponding epigenetic mark persists in both the germline and the relevant somatic target tissues. Crucially, studies must empirically demonstrate that the epigenetic modifications either evade or are actively restored following developmental erasure. To isolate true germline inheritance from behavioral or environmental confounders, the framework emphasizes the necessity of excluding underlying DNA sequence variations via genomic sequencing, alongside the use of absolute experimental controls such as in vitro fertilization (IVF) and cross-fostering.

== See also ==
- Contribution of epigenetic modifications to evolution
- Dutch famine of 1944–45#Legacy
- Epigenetics of anxiety and stress–related disorders
- Överkalix study
- Transgenerational epigenetic inheritance in plants
- Transgenerational stress inheritance
- Transgenerational trauma
- Inducible plant defenses against herbivory
