= Tallvik =

Locality in Norrbotten, Sweden

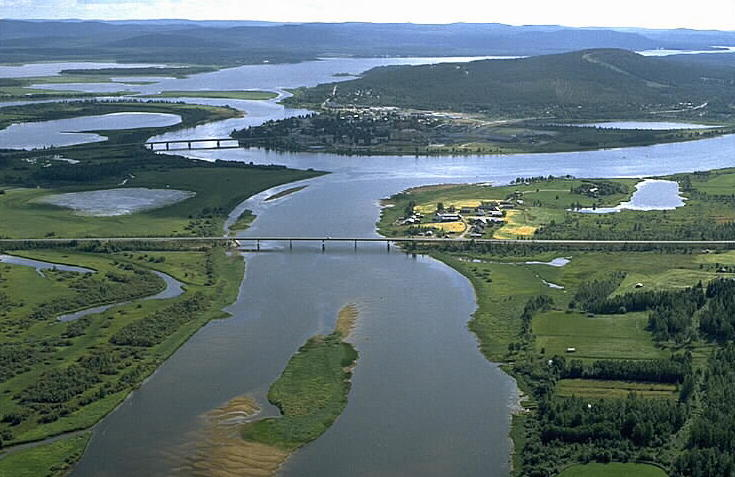
- Aerial view of the nearby Tallviksavan lake

- Location within Norrbotten Location within Sweden
- Coordinates: 66°20′N 22°51′E
- Country: Sweden
- Province: Norrbotten
- County: Norrbotten County
- Municipality: Överkalix Municipality

Area
  - Total: 0.38 km^{2} (0.15 sq mi)

Population (31 December 2010)
  - Total: 434
  - Density: 1,146/km^{2} (2,970/sq mi)
- Time zone: UTC+1 (CET)
  - Summer (DST): UTC+2 (CEST)

Tallvik is a locality situated in Överkalix Municipality, Norrbotten County, Sweden with 434 inhabitants in 2010.
