= Vännäsberget =

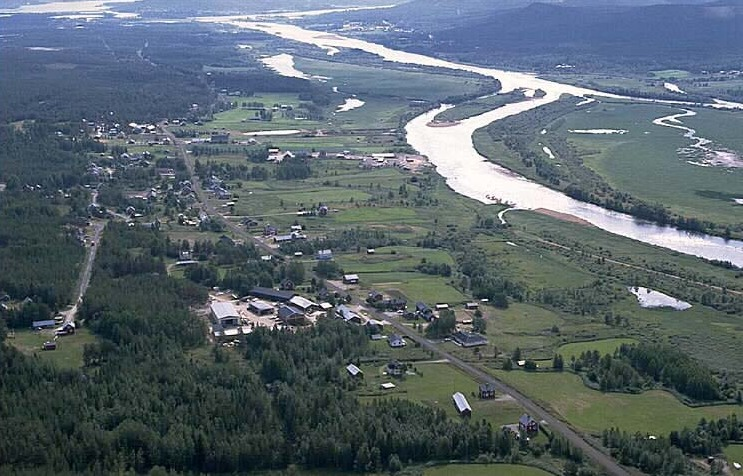

- Location within Norrbotten Location within Sweden
- Coordinates: 66°23′N 22°47′E
- Country: Sweden
- Province: Norrbotten
- County: Norrbotten County
- Municipality: Överkalix Municipality

Area
  - Total: 1.15 km^{2} (0.44 sq mi)

Population (2005-12-31)
  - Total: 207
  - Density: 180/km^{2} (470/sq mi)
- Time zone: UTC+1 (CET)
  - Summer (DST): UTC+2 (CEST)

Vännäsberget is a village situated in Överkalix Municipality, Norrbotten County, Sweden with 207 inhabitants in 2005.
