= Överkalix Municipality =

Överkalix Municipality Överkalix kommun
- Municipality
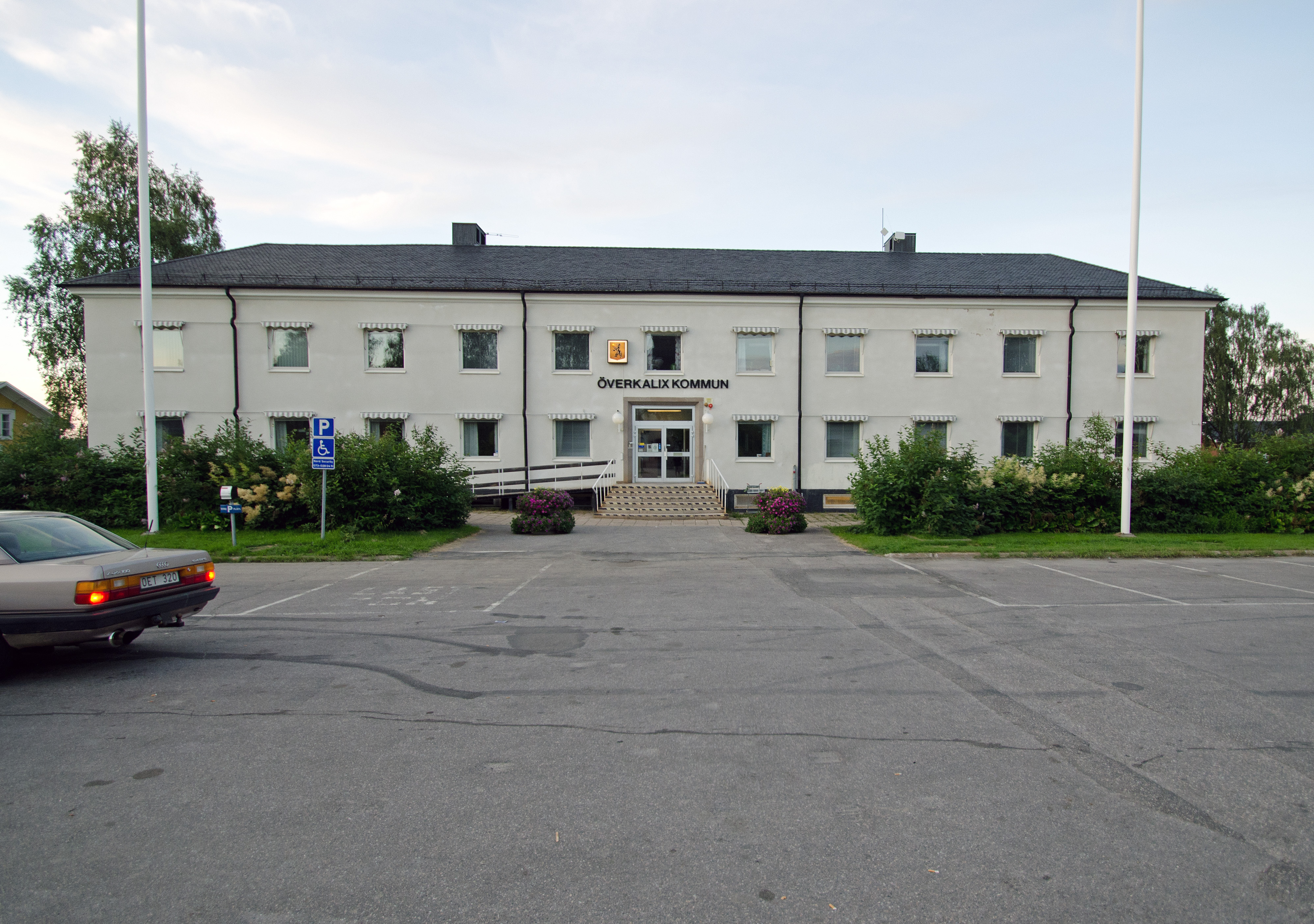
- Överkalix Town Hall

- Coat of arms

- Coordinates: 66°21′N 22°53′E
- Country: Sweden
- County: Norrbotten County
- Seat: Överkalix

Area
  - Total: 2,919.47 km^{2} (1,127.21 sq mi)
  - Land: 2,764.53 km^{2} (1,067.39 sq mi)
  - Water: 154.94 km^{2} (59.82 sq mi)
- Area as of 1 January 2014.

Population (30 June 2025)
  - Total: 3,198
  - Density: 1.157/km^{2} (2.996/sq mi)
- Time zone: UTC+1 (CET)
  - Summer (DST): UTC+2 (CEST)
- ISO 3166 code: SE
- Province: Norrbotten
- Municipal code: 2513
- Website: www.overkalix.se

Överkalix Municipality (Swedish: Överkalix kommun; Finnish: Ylikainuun kunta) is a municipality in Norrbotten County in northern Sweden. Its seat is located in Överkalix.

In 1870 a part of old Överkalix Municipality was detached from it, forming a municipality called Korpilombolo (now in Pajala Municipality). The municipality was not affected by the two subdivision reforms of the 20th century.

The coat of arms was designed in 1944 and based on the arms of the parish. Its exact meaning is not known, but many northern arms feature bears, reindeer or other animals.

== Geography ==
Överkalix Municipality is situated along the south-going Kalix River. The unmodified scenic nature along the river attracts tourists and fishers every year. Within the municipality one also finds two of the river's most powerful waterfalls, Jockfall (9 metres fall) and Linafall (16 metres fall).

Continuing north along the Kalix River one finds the iron ore mines. Travelling south towards the coast one finds larger towns, with Luleå being the closest, located some 100 kilometres south. Transportation is reliable thanks to the E10 highway.

The area otherwise contains much coniferous forests.

=== Localities ===
There are four localities (or urban areas) in Överkalix Municipality:

#	Locality	Population
1	**Överkalix**	946
2	Tallvik	444
3	Svartbyn	281
4	Vännäsberget	207

The municipal seat in bold

== Demographics ==
This is a demographic table based on Överkalix Municipality's electoral districts in the 2022 Swedish general election sourced from SVT's election platform, in turn taken from SCB official statistics.

In total there were 3,249 residents, including 2,574 Swedish citizens of voting age. 58.0% voted for the left coalition and 41.0% for the right coalition. Indicators are in percentage points except population totals and income.

Location	Residents	Citizen adults	Left vote	Right vote	Employed	Swedish parents	Foreign heritage	Income SEK	Degree
Location			%	%					
Överkalix nedre	1,430	1,096	58.2	40.4	82	84	16	22,527	25
Överkalix övre	1,819	1,478	58.0	41.2	84	87	13	22,164	23
Source: SVT

== Language ==
The local Swedish dialect is known as överkalixmål, the Överkalix dialect. It is not mutually intelligible with Standard Swedish.

== Economy ==
The municipality itself is the largest employer with around 430 employees. Thereafter follows Isolamin AB, a company making wall, ceiling and floor elements, with 110 employees. Other sectors:

- Service companies, 150 employees
- Forest and land companies, 45 employees
- Truck and bus companies, 35 employees
- Manufacturing companies, 20 employees

Traditionally the industry was dominated by forest industries, but this has decreased since the 1960s. It is estimated that the service sector will continue to expand and be the dominating sector some day. Many of those companies are in the field of computers and telecommunications.

== Elections ==
=== Riksdag ===
These are the results of the elections to the Riksdag since the 1972 municipal reform. Norrbotten Party also contested the 1994 election but due to the party's small size at a nationwide level SCB did not publish the party's results at a municipal level. The same applies to the Sweden Democrats between 1988 and 1998. "Turnout" denotes the percentage of eligible voters casting any ballots, whereas "Votes" denotes the number of actual valid ballots cast.

Year	Turnout	Votes	V	S	MP	C	L	KD	M	SD	ND	NP/SP
1973	90.0	3,671	15.0	56.8	0.0	20.9	2.2	0.7	3.8	0.0	0.0	0.0
1976	89.2	3,712	13.3	58.5	0.0	21.0	2.4	0.5	3.7	0.0	0.0	0.0
1979	89.0	3,620	10.4	58.2	0.0	19.0	3.1	0.6	5.5	0.0	0.0	0.0
1982	88.8	3,543	9.3	63.0	0.9	16.9	2.1	0.6	5.4	0.0	0.0	0.0
1985	88.1	3,431	9.8	65.3	0.5	13.2	5.2	0.0	5.9	0.0	0.0	0.0
1988	84.4	3,142	9.6	63.9	2.5	14.2	3.6	0.5	4.5	0.0	0.0	0.0
1991	84.4	3,111	10.0	61.7	1.5	12.6	4.5	2.1	6.0	0.0	1.5	0.0
1994	86.1	3,166	11.8	65.0	1.9	11.2	3.1	0.9	5.1	0.0	0.4	0.0
1998	80.6	2,775	21.0	53.2	2.5	9.3	2.2	3.9	7.3	0.0	0.0	0.0
2002	80.7	2,616	13.0	53.6	3.2	9.3	3.2	3.4	3.5	0.2	0.0	10.0
2006	78.5	2,440	12.6	58.5	2.1	11.4	2.5	2.6	7.1	0.8	0.0	0.8
2010	83.3	2,487	10.8	61.0	2.4	9.1	3.0	1.4	8.1	3.7	0.0	0.0
2014	85.4	2,382	10.5	52.5	2.2	8.9	1.8	1.1	8.1	13.0	0.0	0.0
2018	85.4	2,270	10.5	46.7	1.1	8.8	2.1	3.4	7.8	18.3	0.0	0.0

Blocs

This lists the relative strength of the socialist and centre-right blocs since 1973, but parties not elected to the Riksdag are inserted as "other", including the Sweden Democrats results from 1988 to 2006, but also the Christian Democrats pre-1991 and the Greens in 1982, 1985 and 1991. The sources are identical to the table above. The coalition or government mandate marked in bold formed the government after the election. New Democracy got elected in 1991 but are still listed as "other" due to the short lifespan of the party.

Year	Turnout	Votes	Left	Right	SD	Other	Elected
1973	90.0	3,671	**71.8**	26.9	0.0	1.3	98.7
1976	89.2	3,712	71.8	**27.1**	0.0	1.1	98.9
1979	89.0	3,620	68.6	**27.6**	0.0	3.8	96.2
1982	88.8	3,543	**72.3**	24.4	0.0	3.3	96.7
1985	88.1	3,431	**75.1**	24.3	0.0	0.6	99.4
1988	84.4	3,142	**76.0**	22.3	0.0	1.7	98.3
1991	84.4	3,111	71.7	**25.2**	0.0	3.1	96.9
1994	86.1	3,166	**78.7**	20.3	0.0	1.0	99.0
1998	80.6	2,775	**76.7**	22.7	0.0	0.6	99.4
2002	80.7	2,616	**69.8**	19.4	0.0	10.8	89.2
2006	78.5	2,440	73.2	**23.6**	0.0	3.2	96.8
2010	83.3	2,487	74.2	**21.6**	3.7	0.5	99.5
2014	85.4	2,382	**65.2**	19.9	13.0	1.9	98.1
