= Telomere-associated protein RIF1 =

Protein

RIF1

Identifiers
- Aliases: RIF1, replication timing regulatory factor 1
- External IDs: OMIM: 608952; MGI: 1098622; GeneCards: RIF1

Gene location (Human)
Chr.	Chromosome 2 (human)
Band	2q23.3	Start	151,409,883 bp
Band	2q23.3	End	151,508,013 bp

Gene location (Mouse)
Chr.	Chromosome 2 (mouse)
Band	2 C1.1|2 29.98 cM	Start	51,962,844 bp
Band	2 C1.1|2 29.98 cM	End	52,012,395 bp
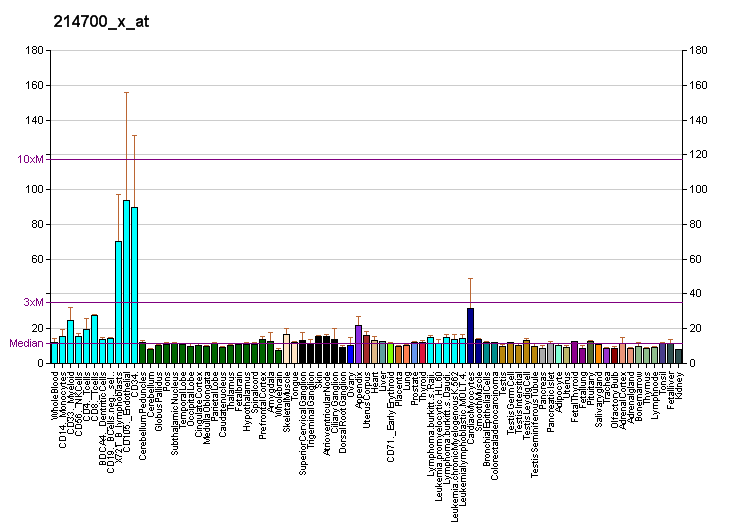
RNA expression pattern
Bgee	Human / Mouse (ortholog); Top expressed in: buccal mucosa cell; gastrocnemius muscle; muscle of thigh; Achilles tendon; testicle; secondary oocyte; Skeletal muscle tissue of rectus abdominis; corpus callosum; internal globus pallidus; gonad / Top expressed in: spermatocyte; zygote; secondary oocyte; primary oocyte; primitive streak; cumulus cell; epiblast; Gonadal ridge; spermatid; abdominal wall; More reference expression data
BioGPS	More reference expression data
Gene ontology
Molecular function	protein binding
Cellular component	cytoplasm; telomere; plasma membrane; spindle; male pronucleus; female pronucleus; nucleus; cytoskeleton; nucleoplasm; chromosome; condensed chromosome; nuclear body; nuclear membrane; spindle midzone; site of double-strand break
Biological process	stem cell population maintenance; cell cycle; double-strand break repair via nonhomologous end joining; negative regulation of transcription by RNA polymerase II; telomere maintenance; telomere maintenance in response to DNA damage; positive regulation of histone H3-K9 methylation; cellular response to DNA damage stimulus; positive regulation of isotype switching; negative regulation of double-strand break repair via homologous recombination; positive regulation of double-strand break repair via nonhomologous end joining; DNA repair; cellular response to leukemia inhibitory factor
Sources:Amigo / QuickGO
Orthologs
Databases	NCBI: entry; OMA: entry
Species	Human	Mouse
Entrez	55183	51869
Ensembl	ENSG00000080345	ENSMUSG00000036202
UniProt	Q5UIP0	Q6PR54
RefSeq (mRNA)	NM_001177663; NM_001177664; NM_001177665; NM_018151	NM_175238; NM_001355414; NM_001355415
RefSeq (protein)	NP_001171134; NP_001171135; NP_001171136; NP_060621	NP_780447; NP_001342343; NP_001342344
Location (UCSC)	Chr 2: 151.41 – 151.51 Mb	Chr 2: 51.96 – 52.01 Mb
PubMed search
- Wikidata
View/Edit Human	View/Edit Mouse

Telomere-associated protein RIF1 is a protein that in humans is encoded by the RIF1 gene.

RIF1 and RIF2 cap the chromosome ends (telomeres) in yeast. In higher eukaryotes, Rif1 is involved in DNA damage response, organisation of chromatin architecture and the regulation of replication timing. RIF1 has been shown to bind to RNA in the nucleus.
