= EBI3 =

Protein-coding gene in the species Homo sapiens

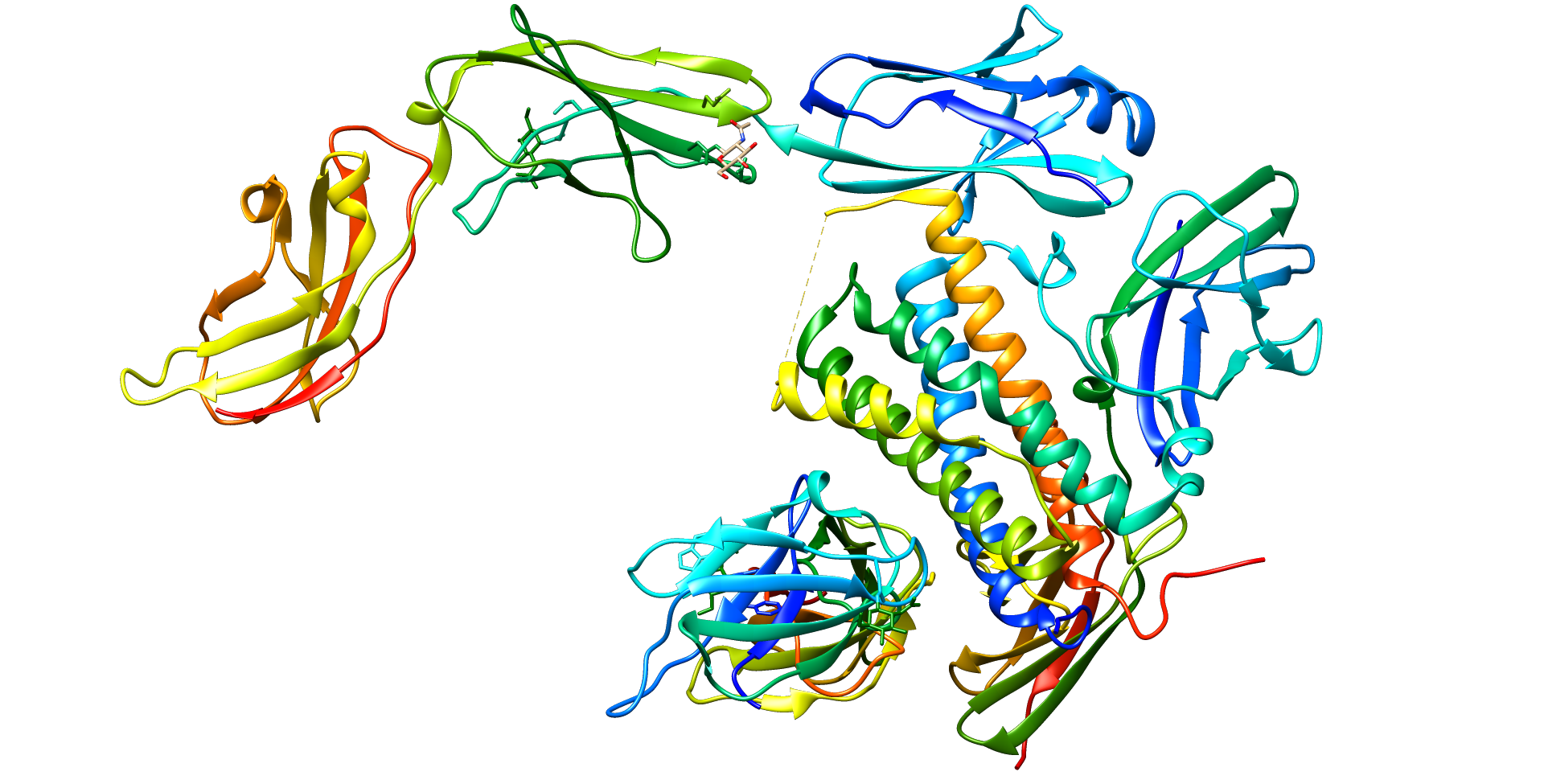

Identifiers
- Aliases: EBI3, IL-27B, IL27B, Epstein-Barr virus induced 3, IL35B
- External IDs: OMIM: 605816; MGI: 1354171; GeneCards: EBI3
Available structures
PDB	Ortholog search: PDBe RCSB
PDB	List of PDB id codes 7U7N, 7Z0L, 7ZG0, 7ZXK, 8D85

Gene location (Human)
Chr.	Chromosome 19 (human)
Band	19p13.3	Start	4,229,523 bp
Band	19p13.3	End	4,237,528 bp

Gene location (Mouse)
Chr.	Chromosome 17 (mouse)
Band	17 D|17 29.08 cM	Start	56,259,640 bp
Band	17 D|17 29.08 cM	End	56,264,022 bp
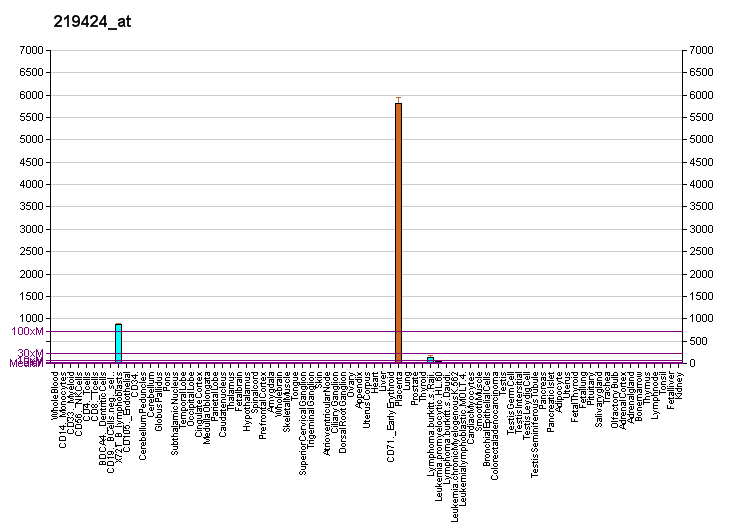
RNA expression pattern
Bgee	Human / Mouse (ortholog); Top expressed in: placenta; decidua; spleen; appendix; lymph node; gonad; gallbladder; right adrenal gland; C1 segment; right coronary artery / Top expressed in: granulocyte; splanchnocranium; rib; hyoid bone; humerus; stroma of bone marrow; sphenoid bone; Meckel's cartilage; lesser wing of sphenoid bone; tibiofemoral joint; More reference expression data
BioGPS	More reference expression data
Gene ontology
Molecular function	cytokine receptor activity; cytokine activity; interleukin-27 receptor binding; protein binding; ciliary neurotrophic factor receptor activity; cytokine binding
Cellular component	extracellular region; plasma membrane; membrane; extracellular space; endoplasmic reticulum lumen; external side of plasma membrane; receptor complex; ciliary neurotrophic factor receptor complex; CNTFR-CLCF1 complex
Biological process	T-helper 1 type immune response; T cell proliferation; humoral immune response; positive regulation of alpha-beta T cell proliferation; regulation of signaling receptor activity; interleukin-27-mediated signaling pathway; interleukin-35-mediated signaling pathway; ciliary neurotrophic factor-mediated signaling pathway
Sources:Amigo / QuickGO
Orthologs
Databases	NCBI: entry; OMA: entry
Species	Human	Mouse
Entrez	10148	50498
Ensembl	ENSG00000105246	ENSMUSG00000003206
UniProt	Q14213	O35228
RefSeq (mRNA)	NM_005755	NM_015766
RefSeq (protein)	NP_005746	NP_056581
Location (UCSC)	Chr 19: 4.23 – 4.24 Mb	Chr 17: 56.26 – 56.26 Mb
PubMed search
- Wikidata
View/Edit Human	View/Edit Mouse

Epstein-Barr virus induced gene 3, also known as interleukin-27 subunit beta or IL-27B, is a protein which in humans is encoded by the EBI3 gene.

== Function ==
This gene was identified by the induction of its expression in B lymphocytes by Epstein–Barr virus infection. The protein encoded by this gene is a secreted glycoprotein, which is a member of the hematopoietin receptor family related to the p40 subunit of interleukin 12 (IL-12). It plays a role in regulating cell-mediated immune responses.

EBI3 is a subunit in 2 distinct heterodimeric cytokines: interleukin-27 (IL27) and IL35. IL27 is composed of p28 (IL27) and EBI3. IL27 can trigger signaling in T cells, B cells, and myeloid cells. IL35, an inhibitory cytokine involved in regulatory T-cell function, is composed of EBI3 and the p35 subunit of IL12.
