= Hard inheritance =

Hard inheritance was a model of heredity that explicitly excludes any acquired characteristics, such as of Lamarckism. It is the exact opposite of soft inheritance, coined by Ernst Mayr to contrast ideas about inheritance.

Hard inheritance states that characteristics of an organism's offspring (passed on through DNA) will not be affected by the actions that the parental organism performs during its lifetime. For example: a medieval blacksmith who uses only his right arm to forge steel will not sire a son with a stronger right arm than left because the blacksmith's actions do not alter his genetic code. Inheritance due to usage and non-usage is excluded. Inheritance works as described in the modern synthesis of evolutionary biology.

The existence of inherited epigenetic variants has led to renewed interest in soft inheritance.
