= Chromosome 15q trisomy =

- Other names: duplication 15 q

Chromosome 15q duplication is a large and heterogeneous group of rare genetic disorders in which there is an extra, 3rd (duplicated) copy of a segment of DNA at least 50 base pairs long originating on the long ("q") arm of human chromosome 15. As a result, affected cells of the body contain a total of 3 copies of these duplicated bases, instead of the usual 2 copies - one inherited from the mother and one from the father - found in the normal human diploid genome.

== Signs and symptoms ==
The disorder is primarily characterized by growth abnormalities, which range from growth retardation to accelerated growth, intellectual disability, and distinctive malformations of the head and face. Additional abnormalities may involve malformation of the skeleton, spine and neck; fingers and/or toes; genitals (particularly in males); and, in some cases, heart problems and seizures.

== Diagnosis ==
The diagnosis of partial trisomy 15q can be made prenatally or postnatally.

The method used for precise diagnosis depends on a number of factors, including the size of the segment of duplicated material, its location, its orientation (inverted), and others.

== Treatment ==
The condition is incurable and treatment is based on alleviating symptoms.

== Epidemiology ==
C15 trisomy affects twice as many males as females. Fewer than 50 cases have been reported.

== See also ==
- Chromosome 15q partial deletion
