= Epigenetics of chronic pain =

Field of study

Epigenetics of chronic pain is the study of how epigenetic modifications of genes affect the development and maintenance of chronic pain. Chromatin modifications have been found to affect neural function, such as synaptic plasticity and memory formation, which are important mechanisms of chronic pain. In 2015, 20% of adults dealt with chronic pain. Epigenetics can provide a new perspective on the biological mechanisms and potential treatments of chronic pain.

== Chronic pain ==
Chronic pain is often caused by peripheral tissue inflammation or nerve and tissue damage. Chronic pain can have a variety of causes, but one potential cause is the production of a pain wind-up, which is an increase in pain intensity in response to persistent activation of pain signals. This persistent pain reduces the threshold to feel pain over time and amplifies the pain response at the site of injury and surrounding areas.

Around 100 million adults have chronic pain in the US, and the economic loss caused by chronic pain is around 600 million dollars. Chronic pain and accompanying chronic health conditions take a physical and mental toll on those who suffer from them. Rates of depression have been shown to be higher in people with chronic pain, and it has been found to be highly comorbid with PTSD.

As for treatment, there are predominantly two options: opioids and anti-inflammatory drugs. These drugs target the side effects of chronic pain and help manage the pain. However, they don't address the root cause of the pain and often have bad side effects and risk for substance abuse. For example, while opioids can be beneficial for some, it can be harmful for others. Some adverse effects of opioids include impaired immune system, physical dependence, and overdose.

Understanding the epigenetic modifications associated with chronic pain will potentially help identify the biological mechanism of its development and inform future treatment plans.

== Epigenetic alterations ==
Epigenetic alterations involve lasting changes in gene expression, without changes in DNA sequence, but are instead due to a chemical modification of, or a persistent addition to the chromatin. They can enhance or suppress gene expression, and there are a variety of mechanisms through which this occurs. The major mechanisms of epigenetic alterations include DNA methylation, histone modifications (methylation, acetylation, phosphorylation etc.), and non-coding RNA regulation of gene expression. For the purpose of this topic, this article will focus on the first two.

=== Histone methylation ===
In histone methylation, methyl groups are added to individual amino acids in histone proteins, and gene expression can be enhanced or repressed, depending on the location and degree of methylation on any given histone. Epigenetic alterations in gene expression are responsive to changes in an organism's experience and environment.

The methylation of Lys27 histone H3 at a proinflammatory cytokine promoter (MCP-3) has been shown to decrease in spinal injury models. This decrease in methylation increased the production of pro-inflammatory cytokines, which regulate immune system function, long-term. This was shown to lead to central sensitization and a neuropathic, or chronic, pain-like state.

In addition to histones, certain regions of DNA undergo frequent epigenetic modifications. CpG islands are regions of DNA in which there is a high density of CpGs, nucleotides cytosine and guanine linked by a phosphate group. They are frequently methylated, and their modification has important implications in changing gene expression. Within rodent inflammatory pain models, levels of methylation of CpG islands in DNA have been linked to the nociceptive, or pain, threshold.

In regards to clinical relevance, hypermethylation of CpG islands are very often seen in cancerous cells, which is a disease strongly associated with chronic pain. Recent human studies have suggested the hypermethylation of CpG islands in malignant cells may be associated with enhanced production of pro-nociceptive peptides, providing a potential explanation for cancer-induced pain. Research in the field points to pharmacological intervention of DNA methylation as a promising new direction.

=== Histone acetylation ===
Histone acetylation is the process where acetyl groups are added to the histone by histone acetyltransferase (HATs). Histone acetylation promotes gene expression by making the DNA more accessible for transcription. The removal of these acetyl groups is done by histone deacetylases (HDACs). Histone acetylation has been found to play a part in pain sensitivity and chronic pain development.

The sensitization of nociceptive neurons, which are responsible for transmitting pain signals, is thought to be an important aspect of chronic pain. In this context, sensitization is the increased sensitivity of a neuron's response to a stimulus after persistent, repetitive activation. Recent studies have shown a possible association between histone acetylation and nociceptive sensitization. Histone acetylation in the dorsal horn of the spine has been shown to affect nociceptive sensitivity in animal models. The upregulation of HDAC1 and decrease in histone H3 acetylation in the dorsal horn of the spine was found to be adaptations that increase pain sensitivity. The administration of a general HDACi, which is an HDAC inhibitor, helps to alleviate the hyperalgesia, or, and allodynia caused by a spinal injury. It also reversed the increased HDAC1 expression and the reduction of histone H3 acetylation. This experiment was done with other general HDACis, and similar results in the pain alleviation were found.

Histone acetylation also plays a role in inflammatory pain. Induced inflammatory pain caused an increase in the production of HDAC2 proteins in the dorsal horn. The administration of HDACis, such as SAHA, suberanilohydroxamic acid, and TSA, trichostatin A, caused a decrease in hyperplasia and an increase in histone acetylation in the superficial layers of the spinal cord.

HDAC inhibitors can also relieve pain sensation by repressing the over acetylation of histone H3 in the promoter region of inflammatory proteins and chemokine CC receptors. Intrathecal injection of a HDAC inhibitory can reverse the CCI-induced hyperalgesia and mechanical allodynia.

== Specific mechanisms ==
H3K9 methylation is an important part of the neuropathic pain pathway. The main markers for chronic neuropathic pain are a rise in excitability in primary afferent neurons and a decrease in potassium channel expression in primary sensory neurons. Peripheral nerve damage causes prolonged downregulation of voltage-gated potassium channels. This downregulation causes dorsal root ganglion neurons to be hyper excited and increases pain sensitivity overall. There was an increase in G9a expression and its product H3K9me2 when a nerve injury occurred. A chromatin-immunoprecipitation assay showed that there was a rise in protein enrichment of H3K9 at promoter regions of potassium channel genes. This caused the downregulation of the voltage-gated potassium channels in subunit Kcna2 in the dorsal root ganglion (DRG). A knockout of G9a in the DRG neurons resulted in the regular expression of potassium channels and no development of chronic pain after nerve injury. Another important role of H3K9me2 is its effect on opioid receptors. The MOR receptor is expressed in DRG neurons and is crucial for the pain-relieving effect of MOR agonists. Nerve damage was shown to cause a decrease in the expression of MORs in DRG. Nerve injury causes an increased enrichment of H3K9me2 at the promoter site of the MOR gene, causing the repression of the gene. A knockout of G9a restores the MOR expression and analgesic effect of morphine after injury.

H3K27me3 is a repressive mark that is mediated by the PCR2 complex. PCR2 has a methyltransferase EZH2. Nerve damage stimulates EZH2 expression and increases the enrichment of H3K27me3 at the promoter site of potassium channel genes. Although the injury of nerves does increase EZH2 expression, the inhibition of EZH2 has minimal effect on management of chronic pain.

GAD65, glutamic acid decarboxylase 65, expression is also found to play a part in chronic pain. Long lasting inflammatory and neuropathic pain decreased the expression of GAD65 in the nucleus raphe magnus, which is in the ventral medulla. The nucleus raphe magnus utilizes HDACs to mediate histone hypoacetylation for pain control. The decrease of GAD65 leads to reduced GABA synaptic inhibition. The treatment of HDACis in nucleus raphe magnus caused increased expression of GAD65, normal GABA synaptic inhibition, and ceased oversensitivity.

Arginine methylation is the process where protein arginine methyltransferases, PRMTs, add methyl groups on arginine residue. Nerve injury has a significant effect on these PRMTs' activity. In the DRG of mice, peripheral nerve damage increases the expression of PRMT4 and decreases the expression of PRMT8 and PRMT9. PRMT8 is special because it is mainly expressed in the nervous system and catalyzes arginine methylation for dendritic spine maturation and synaptic plasticity. The reduction of PRMT8 leads to a decreased amount of NMDA receptor subunit GluN2A. This reduced level of GluN2A and PRMT8 leads to hypersensitivity to pain. In terms of PRMT4, the knockout of PRMT4 has shown to decrease pain hypersensitivity, but it is not clear which genes or proteins are responsible for this interaction.

Noncoding RNAs also play a role in chronic pain. They include long ncRNAs, circular RNAs, antisense RNAs, and microRNAs, which all regulate transcription, translation, and mRNA stability. Neural pain can increase the expression of certain antisense ncRNAs through transcription factors, which can turn on and off genes associated with pain. A decreased level of Ds-lncRNA, which is a long ncRNA, after neural injury enhances the binding of RALY, an RNA cofactor, to RNA polymerase II. This causes an increased G9a expression which increases pain awareness.

== Treatment ==
One potential treatment option is inhibiting the deacetylation of histones. There are eighteen identified HDAC genes, and they have varying effects on the nervous system. Intrathecal injection of HDAC inhibitors resulted in the reduction of inflammatory pain in rats. The administration of HDAC inhibitors increase the activity of glutamate decarboxylase promoters GAD65 and GAD67, which are normally involved in enhancing GABA inhibition and reducing pain. This experiment suggests that blocking the removal of acetyl groups on histone could be the way to manage chronic pain. An example of an HDAC inhibitor in use is Valproic acid. Valproic acid is a substance used to treat seizures, but it is now in a trial to treat migraines by blocking HDACs. Givinostat is another HDAC inhibitor that is being reviewed in treating juvenile arthritis pain.

Another potential therapeutic mechanism is histone methylation. There is little research on this particular epigenetic mechanism as it relates to chronic pain. However, folate, a prenatal vitamin, has been shown to be an important cofactor in DNA methylation during pregnancy. More research needs to be done before folate can be suggested as a potential therapeutic.

DNA methylation inhibitors showed a potential to treat chronic pain. A study found there was an increase in DNA methylation in mice's spines after a chronic injury. An intrathecal injection of DNMT inhibitor reduced this methylation increase and also the hypersensitivity to pain in the spine. Also DNMT inhibitor, zebularine, also was shown to reduce thermal hyperplasia after chronic stress.
