= Sleep epigenetics =

Heritable characteristics affecting sleep

Sleep epigenetics is the field of how epigenetics (heritable characteristics that do not involve changes in DNA sequence) affects sleep.

Research in the field of epigenetics has proven the significance of various environmental experiences. Changes in sleep can cause critical changes to the epigenome, while changes to the epigenome can, in turn, have a crucial influence on experiences related to sleep. Early life experiences with stress can produce lifelong changes in the number of glucocorticoid receptors and impair sleep. Additionally, sleep deprivation alters individuals’ epigenome via changes to methylation, histones, and non-coding RNA. The development of sleep disorders such as insomnia, sleep apnea, and narcolepsy can be greatly impacted by epigenetic changes. Additionally, various methods have been discovered that can reverse, prevent, and treat sleep-related issues by causing epigenetic changes.

== Stress ==
Exposure to stress, particularly during early life, has significant impacts on an individual's response to future experiences of stress. Research on epigenetic changes caused by differences in the amount of time rats were nurtured by their mother is one example of these significant impacts. When examining the epigenome of rat offspring, it is noted that alterations to the epigenome occur at the glucocorticoid receptor (GR) gene promoter in the hippocampus. This happens when the offspring experience a significant amount of licking and grooming from their mother at an early age. The offspring that experience a significant amount of licking and grooming develop differences in DNA methylation compared to the offspring that receive an insignificant amount of licking and grooming. The offspring that are inadequately nurtured by their mother become highly susceptible to stressful environments. These epigenetic differences can be seen as early as the first week of life and persist into adulthood. However, evidence shows that when offspring are cross-fostered to receive a good amount of licking and grooming, the epigenetic differences are reversed, supporting a causal relationship between the maternal effect and the epigenetic stress responses in offspring. This proposes that the offspring's epigenome can be altered and established through early life experiences.

The effect of stress on sleep can be predicted long before a baby is born. It is hypothesized that increasing cortisol levels in mothers reduces the amount of glucocorticoid receptors (GRs) in an infant's hippocampus, lowering the physiological role of the negative feedback loop on the hypothalamic-pituitary-adrenal (HPA) axis. The HPA axis is important for regulating the wake-sleep cycle but works with other factors that help modulate sleep as well. When the negative feedback loop is disrupted due to stress, the HPA axis in newborns becomes hyperactive and the amount of cortisol in circulation elevates. However, the hyperactivity of the HPA axis and the elevated levels of cortisol in the hippocampus can be reversed or lowered to normal levels after demethylation of the hippocampal GR promoter, further providing evidence of the involvement of epigenetic mechanisms in HPA axis modifications.

Glucocorticoids are a necessity for life. They play a large role in a majority of physiological functions involving metabolism, blood pressure, breathing, the immune system, and behavior. Either acute or chronic stress can alter the response of the HPA axis. However, the stage of life at which an individual is exposed to stress will determine the magnitude of the consequences they will face in the future. Early life exposure to stress during the critical period of childhood development can result in permanent changes to adult response systems.

== Sleep deprivation ==
Sleep deprivation is a significant societal problem. It is estimated that around 35.2% of all adults in the US sleep less than 7 hours. Lifestyle choices, health conditions, and the use of stimulants are examples of some of the causes that underlie sleep deprivation in humans. Sleep deprivation is known to cause metabolic changes, such as altered expression of metabolic genes and hormones. These changes in expression lead to a higher risk of obesity, heart disease, stroke, and high blood pressure. These impacts are also seen at the cognitive level, causing deficits in synaptic plasticity, decreased synapse strength, an inhibited ability to form and maintain memories, and changes in mood. In the long term, these cognitive changes may develop into psychiatric disorders and neurodegenerative diseases like Alzheimer's disease. Epigenomic changes such as changes in DNA methylation, histone modifications, and changes in non-coding RNA caused by sleep deprivation may be the cause of these phenotypic presentations.

CpG methylation is the addition of a methyl group to a cytosine-guanine dinucleotide. It is the most common epigenetic modification and is correlated with decreased gene expression. Past studies have suggested that sleep deprivation may increase CpG methylation. One such study in mice showed that sleep deprivation increases gene expression of Dnmt3a1 and Dnmt3a2, which are genes that code for enzymes that establish and maintain CpG methylation. Another study found that one night of sleep deprivation causes the hypermethylation of circadian clock genes–CLOCK and CRY1. The circadian clock is a biochemical oscillator in organisms that is in sync with the 24 hour cycle of the Earth's rotation and has been found to impact gene expression and behavior. A different study showed that the gene encoding for the enzyme SCD1 was hypermethylated following sleep deprivation; this enzyme is crucial in fatty acid desaturation, which is involved in metabolism. The disruption of metabolic pathways may affect hippocampal memory as well. A study of differentially methylated positions caused by experiencing insufficient sleep found that 78% of the differentially methylated positions were hypomethylated, yet it is noted that the effect of hypomethylation on transcription depends on the location of the CpG. Concluding the exact effect on the level of gene expression is difficult.

One post-translational modification that alters histone conformation is histone acetylation which is the transferring of an acetyl moiety from acetyl-CoA to lysine residues. This modification promotes the assembly of transcription factors via the loosening of chromatin and the ability of acetyl groups to act as binding sites. The binding of transcription factors promotes gene expression. Some evidence suggests that sleep deprivation causes a decrease in histone acetylation. Studies in sleep-deprived rats have found a decrease in acetylated histones at the BDNF promoter IV, which is crucial for learning and memory. Models disrupting the sleep-wake cycle in flies and models of neurodegenerative diseases suggest that decreased histone acetylation is associated with neuronal dysfunction.

Long non-coding RNAs and microRNAs have important roles in a majority of biological pathways. The roles of LncRNAs include regulation of splicing and translation and recruitment of epigenetic and regulatory components to target genomic loci. The fact that a large portion of tissue-specific RNA exists in the brain is evidence that LncRNAs might play a role in neuronal function. Studies in sleep deprived mice observed an impact in the levels of expression of several LncRNAs, yet no function has been found for them. MicroRNAs have a role in many neurological processes, such as synaptic plasticity. Several studies have associated them with circadian expression and sleep. Some studies have found altered microRNA expression following sleep deprivation such as altered let-7b and miR-125a expression, yet the ability to draw concrete conclusions on this is limited because there is an abundance of both microRNAs and their targets.

=== Sleep disorders ===
There are epigenetic changes that may contribute to the development of various sleep disorders.

The epigenetics of insomnia has a large literature. There are arguments that insomnia may be influenced by epigenetic phenomena, and insomnia has both sleep mechanisms and stress-response-related gene environment interactions that affect brain plasticity. There has been growing evidence of the role heritability has on insomnia development but the main factor that determines if a person develops insomnia is stress. Insomnia may be the result of an epigenetic control process of sleep mechanics and may be influenced by changes in brain plasticity caused by exposure to stress. There has been a link to the development of insomnia to the circadian clock. It is believed that humans’ intrinsic time-tracking system, the circadian clock, may be affected by dynamic changes in chromatin transitions. It has been found that there are links to circadian regulators, the remodeling of chromatins, and cellular metabolism. The protein of interest is known as the central clock protein CLOCK, and this protein has HAT enzymatic properties. The central clock protein CLOCK allows histone H3 to be acetylated, and it also allows its dimerization partner BMAL1 at K537 to be acetylated. This acetylation is important for the function of the circadian clock. The HDAC activity of the NAD(+) - dependent SIRT1 enzyme's regulation is also related to the circadian clock. The SIRT1 enzyme is thought to work as an enzymatic rheostat of circadian function, and it does this by sending transduced signals from the cellular metabolites to the circadian clock. Therefore, it is believed that at the core of the circadian machinery there is a method of chromatin remodeling responsible for insomnia.

Sleep apnea is a condition commonly found in the general population. This condition causes an individual to stop and restart breathing on multiple occasions while sleeping. This condition negatively impacts the well-being of the individual because it can prevent the body from receiving enough oxygen. Current evidence indicates that histone modifications, non-coding RNAs, and DNA methylation are epigenetic mechanisms that are involved in sleep apnea. Having untreated obstructive sleep apnea can lead to developmental deficits such as cognitive impairments, hyperactivity disorder, and poor performance in academic endeavors. There are various hypoxia-mediated perturbations of gene expression that are attributed to obstructive sleep apnea comorbidities due to epigenetic mechanisms. They are however, heritable and reversible epigenetic alterations which include DNA methylation, histone modifications, and the activation of short and long non-coding RNAs that are known to be the response leading to hypoxia and chronic intermittent hypoxia. As of now, there is not much known about the associations of pediatric obstructive sleep apnea and epigenetic alterations.

There are instances where a person may feel fatigued in the daytime, causing experiences of drowsiness and sudden instances of going to sleep. These moments are characterized as a chronic sleep disorder known as narcolepsy. There are several genetic factors such as HLA-DQB*6:02 that have been identified as possibly playing a role in the development of narcolepsy. It is found that top-ranked narcolepsy-associated differentially methylated positions are more common in non-CpG islands. It was reported that patients experiencing narcolepsy in the study had these sites hypomethylated 95% of the time. There is a gene that has been identified that may contribute to the development of this disease known as the CCR3 gene. It appears that this gene shows that both methylation and single-nucleotide polymorphism (SNP) had a close association with narcolepsy. This gene is not necessarily the main cause of this disease and the research suggests that there are other unidentified genetic factors linked to the disease.

Epigenetic Treatment

Abnormal functioning of dopaminergic pathways has been linked to various disorders, including PTSD. Research has been conducted to investigate an epigenetic means by which various symptoms of PTSD, including lucid nightmares, can be reduced. Given that possession of alleles such as the D2A1 allele which cause low dopamine function make an individual susceptible to PTSD, treating the modulation of dopaminergic signals may serve as a way to decrease lucid nightmares in individuals suffering from PTSD. Additionally, the critical role dopamine plays in the synaptic signals of thalamic and neocortical neurons which cause the visual and motor hallucinations in dreams is worth considering. In one study, the use of KB200Z, a dopamine agonist, alleviated the negative symptoms of lucid nightmares in participants with histories of abuse, addiction and PTSD. Epigenetic alteration of neuroplasticity may be significantly inhibited via targeting dopamine pathways and trauma-induced deficiencies in functional connectivity. The use of neurotransmitters to increase potentiation of synaptic pathways specifically at CA1 and CA3 pyramidal cells is a promising way to treat nightmares.

Sleep deprivation increases the expression of HDAC2 which in turn leads to a significant deficiency in histone acetylation. This decreased histone acetylation has been linked to learning and memory deficits and abnormalities in individuals' circadian clock.Trichostatin A has proven to be beneficial when treating sleep deprivation. Since it is an HDAC inhibitor, Trichostatin A has been shown to specifically alleviate spatial memory loss tied to the hippocampus via specifically targeting HDAC2. A decrease in HDAC2 works to reverse the cognitive deficiencies associated with epigenetic changes from chronic sleep deprivation.

Aside from the use of epigenetic drugs to treat the epigenetic effects of sleep disorders, lifestyle changes that can induce epigenetic changes have also been considered. In one study, mice that experienced gestational sleep fragmentation were found to have Foxo1 misregulation. Foxo1 plays a critical role in monitoring insulin signaling in the liver. Various histone modifications and an increase in the epigenetic mark of 5-hydroxy-methyl-CpG at Foxo1 was found to occur in mice which experienced gestational sleep fragmentation. However, when the mice participated in early-life exercise, these epigenetic effects were reversed. The research suggests that taking measures to reverse the epigenetic changes caused by gestational sleep fragmentation decreases the susceptibility of individuals to metabolic disorders such as diabetes and preeclampsia.

More research is needed to identify biomarkers that will allow for the diagnosis and treatment of sleep disorders. Difficulties arise when developing epigenetic treatment due to the highly-sensitive nature of the epigenome in response to the circumstances of its environment. For example, SCN promoter regions of mice underwent significant methylation changes in response to slight changes in the mice's length of day. Though this points to epigenetic alterations being an adaptive force to deal with day-to-day changes to sleep, it presents problems in treating the behavioral phenotypes of sleep disorders that rely on epigenetic regulation that is easily and quickly altered.
