= Structural inheritance =

The centriole, an organelle involved in cell division, is structurally inherited.

Structural inheritance or cortical inheritance is the transmission of an epigenetic trait in a living organism by a self-perpetuating spatial structures. This is in contrast to the transmission of digital information such as is found in DNA sequences, which accounts for the vast majority of known genetic variation.

Examples of structural inheritance include the propagation of prions, the infectious proteins of diseases such as scrapie (in sheep and goats), bovine spongiform encephalopathy ('mad cow disease') and Creutzfeldt–Jakob disease (although the protein-only hypothesis of prion transmission has been considered contentious until recently). Prions based on heritable protein structure also exist in yeast. Structural inheritance has also been seen in the orientation of cilia in protozoans such as Paramecium and Tetrahymena, and 'handedness' of the spiral of the cell in Tetrahymena, and shells of snails. Some organelles also have structural inheritance, such as the centriole, and the cell itself (defined by the plasma membrane) may also be an example of structural inheritance. To emphasize the difference of the molecular mechanism of structural inheritance from the canonical Watson-Crick base pairing mechanism of transmission of genetic information, the term 'epigenetic templating' was introduced.

== History ==
Structural inheritance was discovered by Tracy Sonneborn, and other researchers, during his study on protozoa in the late 1930s. Sonneborn demonstrated during his research on Paramecium that the structure of the cortex was not dependent on genes, or the liquid cytoplasm, but in the cortical structure of the surface of the ciliates. Preexisting cell surface structures provided a template that was passed on for many generations.

John R. Preer, Jr., following up on Sonneborn's work, says, "The arrangement of surface structures is inherited, but how is not known, Macronuclei pass on many of their characteristics to new macronuclei, by an unknown and mysterious mechanism."

Other researchers have come to the conclusion that "the phenomena of cortical inheritance (and related nongenic, epigenetic processes) remind us that the fundamental reproductive unit of life is not a nucleic acid molecule, but the remarkably versatile, intact, living cell."

The study of structural inheritance is part of the extended evolutionary synthesis.

== In popular culture ==
An article in Newsweek mentions research that shows that "Some water fleas sport a spiny helmet that deters predators; others, with identical DNA sequences, have bare heads. What differs between the two is not their genes but their mothers' experiences. If mom had a run-in with predators, her offspring have helmets, an effect one wag called "bite the mother, fight the daughter." If mom lived her life unthreatened, her offspring have no helmets. Same DNA, different traits. Somehow, the experience of the mother, not only her DNA sequences, has been transmitted to her offspring."

Various additional examples of structural inheritance are presented in the recent book Origination of Organismal Form.
