= Chromosome 15q partial deletion =

- Other names: Partial deletion of the long arm of chromosome 15
- Chromosome 15
- Specialty: Medical genetics
- Symptoms: Learning difficulties and/or intellectual disability, usually mild or moderate, delayed speech and bad language skills.
- Complications: People with this disorder have a higher risk of having epilepsy, since one third of children with this disorder have epilepsy.
- Usual onset: Birth
- Duration: Life-long
- Causes: Deletion in long arm of chromosome 15
- Frequency: 1 in 40,000 live births

Chromosome 15q partial deletion is a rare human genetic disorder, caused by a chromosomal aberration in which the long ("q") arm of one copy of chromosome 15 is deleted, or partially deleted. Like other chromosomal disorders, this increases the risk of birth defects, developmental delay and learning difficulties, however, the problems that can develop depend very much on what genetic material is missing. If the mother's copy of the chromosomal region 15q11-13 is deleted, Angelman syndrome (AS) can result. The sister syndrome Prader-Willi syndrome (PWS) can result if the father's copy of the chromosomal region 15q11-13 is deleted. The smallest observed region that can result in these syndromes when deleted is therefore called the PWS/AS critical region. In addition to deletions, uniparental disomy of chromosome 15 also gives rise to the same genetic disorders, indicating that genomic imprinting must occur in this region.

Deletions of regions of chromosome 15 (notably regions 15q15 and 15q22) on several types of human tumours suggest the presence of a potential tumor suppressor gene. This disorder occurs in approximately 1 in 40,000 live births

== See also ==
- Chromosome 15q trisomy
- Genetics
- Genetic deletion
