= Ring chromosome 14 syndrome =

- Other names: Ring 14, Ring chromosome 14
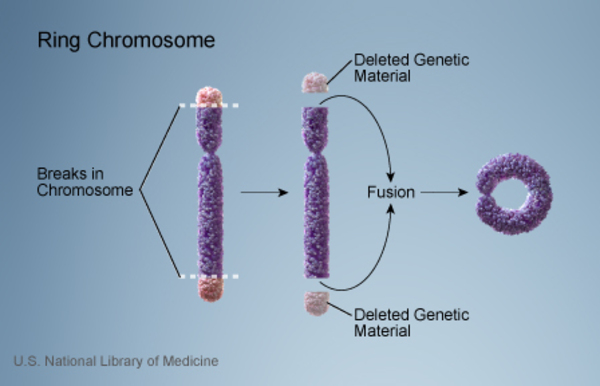
- Formation of a ring chromosome.
- Symptoms: Seizures, intellectual disability
- Causes: Caused by a chromosomal abnormality
- Diagnostic method: MRI, EEG
- Treatment: Anticonvulsive medication

Ring chromosome 14 syndrome is a very rare human chromosome abnormality. It occurs when one or both of the telomeres that mark the ends of chromosome 14 are lost, allowing the now uncapped ends to fuse together – thus forming a ring chromosome. It causes a number of serious health issues.

== Symptoms and signs ==
The most common symptoms are intellectual disability and recurrent seizures developing in infancy or early childhood. Typically, the seizures are resistant to treatment with anti-epileptic drugs. Other symptoms may include:

- Microcephaly
- Lymphedema
- Facial abnormalities
- Immune deficiencies
- Abnormalities of retina
- Slow growth
- Short stature

== Cause ==
Telomer-structure

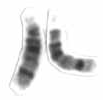
Chr 14

The syndrome is caused by the loss of genetic material near the end of the long arm (q) of chromosome 14 . The break that causes the telomere(s) to be lost occurs near the end of the chromosome, and is called a constitutional ring. These rings arise spontaneously ( it is rarely inherited).

The genetic abnormality occurs randomly in sperm or egg cells or it may occur in early embryonic growth, if it occurs during embryonic growth the ring chromosome may be present in only some of a person's cells.

== Diagnosis ==
Diagnosis is achieved by examining the structure of the chromosomes through karyotyping; while once born, one can do the following to ascertain a diagnosis of the condition:

- MRI
- EEG

== Management ==
A type of anticonvulsant(Carbamazepine)

In terms of the management of ring chromosome 14 syndrome, anticonvulsive medication for seizures, as well as, proper therapy to help prevent respiratory infections in the affected individual are management measures that can be taken.

== Epidemiology ==
Ring chromosome 14 syndrome is extremely rare, the true rate of occurrence is unknown (as it is less than 1 per 1,000,000), but there are at least 50 documented cases in the literature.

== See also ==
- Ring chromosome 18 syndrome
- Ring chromosome 20 syndrome
