= Ring chromosome =

Chromosome whose ends have fused together to form a ring

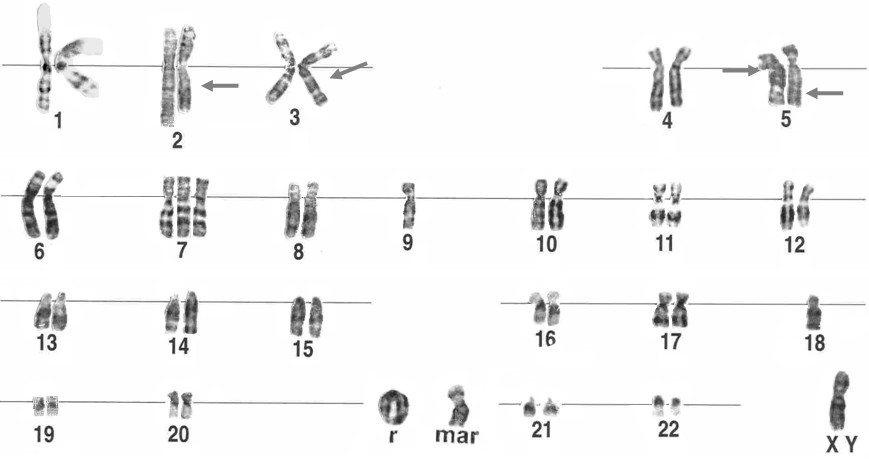
Representative karyotype from a well differentiated transitional cell carcinoma of the bladder. The chromosome indicated by "mar" represents unidentified marker, "r" represents ring chromosome. Arrowheads indicate breakpoints. Also evident are monosomy 9, 18, and X and trisomy 7.

A ring chromosome is an aberrant chromosome whose ends have fused together to form a ring. Early observations of ring chromosomes were made during the development of cytogenetics in the early 20th century. Lilian Vaughan Morgan reported an unusual X chromosome in Drosophila melanogaster in 1926 that appeared “almost or entirely closed and somewhat rounded,” a structure later interpreted as a ring chromosome. In 1930, Mikhail Sergeevich Navashin described chromosomes in species of Crepis whose ends had fused to form a closed ring, providing the first explicit cytological description of ring chromosomes in plants. Barbara McClintock subsequently reported ring chromosomes in maize in 1931 and carried out detailed studies of their behavior and instability in plant cells. Early cytological syntheses subsequently listed ring chromosomes in Crepis (Navashin, 1930), Drosophila (L. V. Morgan, 1933), and maize (McClintock, 1932).

A ring chromosome is denoted by the symbol r in human genetics and R in Drosophila genetics. Ring chromosomes may form in cells following genetic damage by mutagens like radiation, but they may also arise spontaneously during development.

== Formation ==
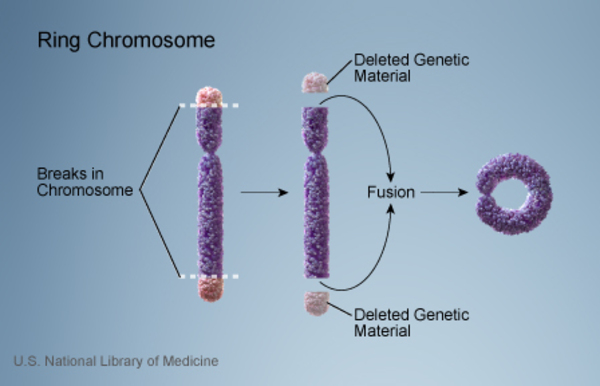
Formation of a ring chromosome.

In order for a chromosome to form a ring, both ends of the chromosome are usually missing, enabling the broken ends to fuse together. In rare cases, the telomeres at the ends of a chromosome fuse without any loss of genetic material, which results in a normal phenotype.

Complex rearrangements, including segmental microdeletions and microduplications, have been seen in numerous ring chromosomes, providing important clues regarding the mechanisms of their formation.

Small supernumerary rings can also form, resulting in a partial trisomy.

Ring chromosomes are unstable during cell division and can form interlocking or fused rings.

== Associated syndromes ==
Human genetic disorders can be caused by ring chromosome formation. Although ring chromosomes are very rare, they have been found in all human chromosomes. Symptoms seen in patients carrying ring chromosomes are more likely to be caused by the deletion of genes in the telomeric regions of affected chromosomes, rather than by the formation of a ring structure itself. Almost all ring chromosome syndromes feature marked growth delay.

Ring chromosomes can be inherited or sporadic. Mosaicism is common and affects the severity of the condition. Location of fusion also affects severity due to loss of differing amounts of genetic material from the ends of chromosomes.

Disorders arising from the formation of a ring chromosome include:

Chromosome	Typical features	Reference
Ring chromosome 1	Microcephaly, facial abnormalities	
Ring chromosome 2	Small stature	
Ring chromosome 3		
Ring chromosome 4	Craniofacial abnormalities	
Ring chromosome 5		
Ring chromosome 6	Microcephaly, facial abnormalities, hand abnormalities	
Ring chromosome 7	Craniofacial abnormalities, speech deficits	
Ring chromosome 8	Craniofacial abnormalities, hydronephrosis, hand abnormalities	
Ring chromosome 9	Delayed growth, abnormal facial features, low muscle tone	
Ring chromosome 10	Delayed growth, facial dysmorphism, reproductive abnormalities	
Ring chromosome 11		
Ring chromosome 12	Delayed growth, abnormal facial features, microcephaly	
Ring chromosome 13	Microcephaly, delayed growth, reproductive abnormalities	
Ring chromosome 14	Epilepsy, intellectual disability	
Ring chromosome 15	Growth delay, microcephaly, intellectual disability	
Ring chromosome 16	Microcephaly, growth delay, facial abnormalities	
Ring chromosome 17		
Ring chromosome 18	Growth delay, facial abnormalities	
Ring chromosome 19		
Ring chromosome 20	Epilepsy, abnormal facial features, growth delay	
Ring chromosome 21	Short stature, microcephaly, reproductive abnormalities	
Ring chromosome 22	Hypotonia, autistic-like behavior	
Ring chromosome X	Turner syndrome	
Ring chromosome Y		

== See also ==
- Chromosome abnormalities
