= Ring chromosome 15 =

- Other names: Ring chromosome 15 syndrome, Ring 15
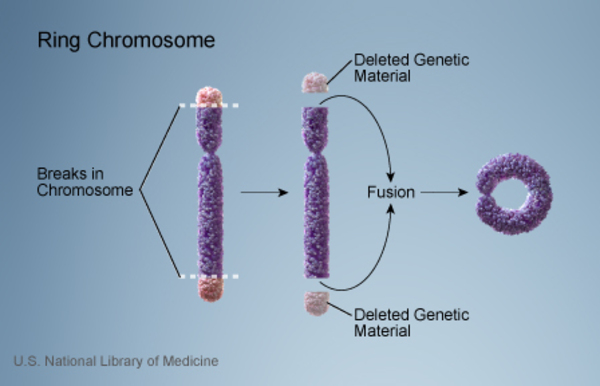
- Diagram of the formation of a ring chromosome
- Specialty: Medical genetics
- Duration: Lifelong
- Causes: Deletion of genetic information from chromosome 15
- Treatment: Supportive
- Frequency: Rare

Ring chromosome 15 (sometimes denoted as r15) is a condition that arises when chromosome 15 fuses to form a ring chromosome. Usually, ring chromosome 15 forms due to the modification or deletion of genetic information on chromosome 15 in the preliminary stages of embryonic development, but it can rarely also be inherited.

All chromosomes have the capacity to form ring chromosomes. The symptoms and severity largely depend on the amount and location of the genetic information lost. If the ends of the chromosome fuse with no loss of genetic material, the individual retains the normal phenotype with relatively slight differences. However, evidence suggests that when there is deletion of genetic information at the distal unstable ends where the subtelomeric structures fuse, syndromes associated with that particular chromosome arise.

Treatment for ring chromosome 15 predominantly targets the management of these symptoms rather than the chromosome ring itself.

== Presentation ==
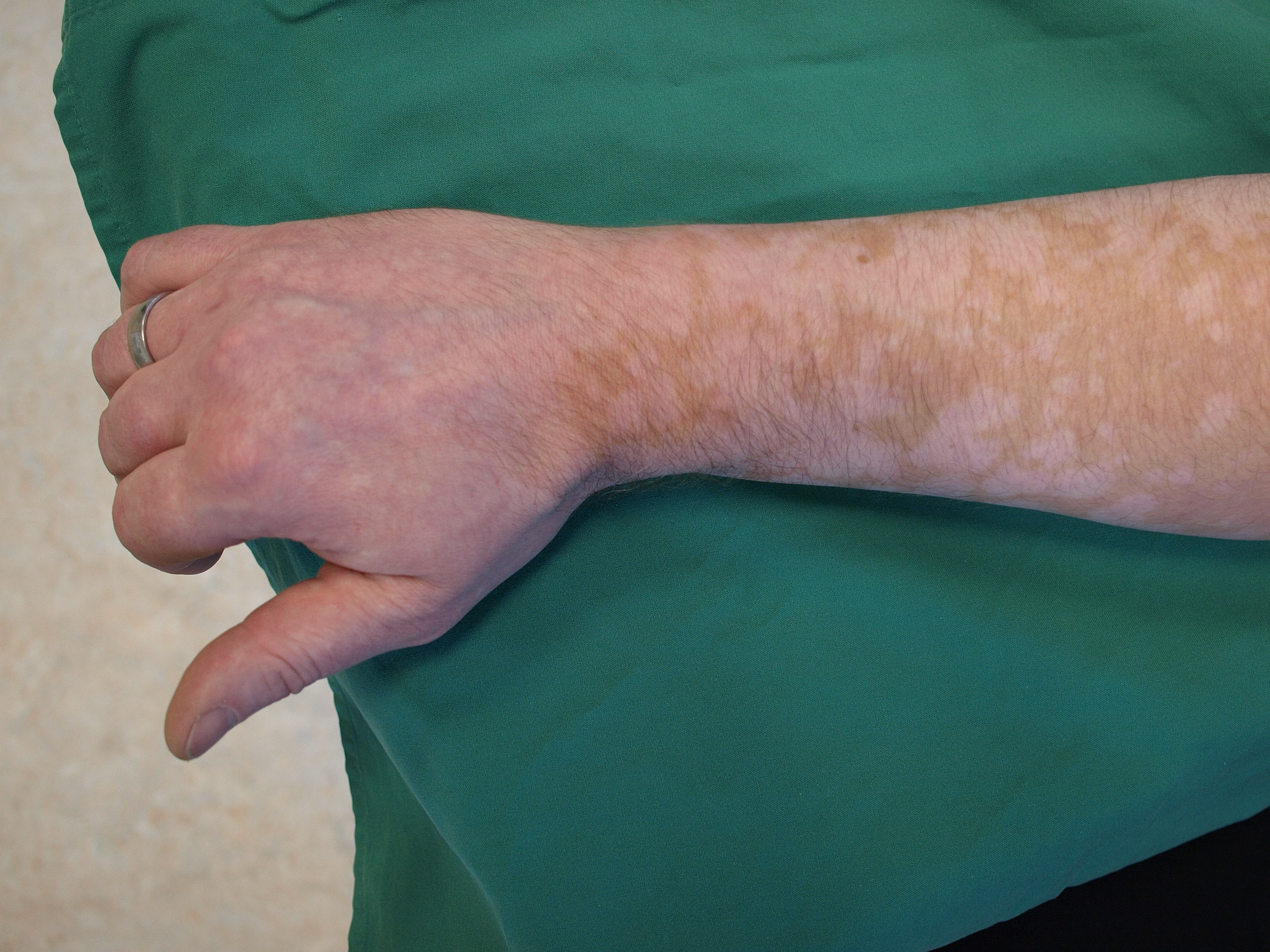
Café au lait spots

Reported cases are few in number, and the phenotype expression for ring chromosome 15 syndrome occurs over a wide spectrum. As well, the cells of patients can have different levels of mosaicism, creating even greater variation in the presence and severity of expression. Thus, while a precise genotype–phenotype association hasn't been fully established, common features associated with the syndrome have been determined.

An examination of 25 cases showed that growth deficiency (present in 100% of reviewed cases), some degree of intellectual disability (95%), and microcephaly (88%) are the most common developments. Other less frequent symptoms include delayed bone age (75%), hypertelorism (46%), brachydactyly (44%), triangular face (42%), speech delay (39%), frontal bossing (36%), anomalous ear (30%), café au lait spots (30%), cryptorchidism (30%) and cardiac abnormalities (30%).

Research into ring chromosome 15 generally attempts to elucidate the causes of symptoms. For example, growth retardation may be caused by terminal deletion of the region 15q26, leading to insulin–like growth factor I resistance.

== Mechanism ==
The human body stores its genetic information in chromosomes. The number of chromosomes and the gene locus on the chromosome is unique to each species. Humans have 23 pairs of chromosomes, 22 pairs of autosomal chromosomes and 1 pair of sex chromosomes that differentiate between males and females. All human chromosomes have 2 arms – the p (short) and the q (long) arm, which are separated by the centromeres.

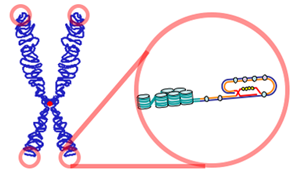
Telomeric ends

There are two proposed mechanisms of forming the ring chromosome. One suggests that chromosome 15 undergoes distortion on both p and q arms prior to the fusion of two broken arms, resulting in great loss of genetic materials. Therefore, the patients of this type of ring chromosome 15 display severe clinical features.

The other proposed mechanism suggests the direct fusion of two telomeres without losing any of the telomeric and subtelomeric sequences. Consequently, most of the genetic material is conserved and symptoms are expressed in a milder form, making diagnosis more difficult.

== Diagnosis ==
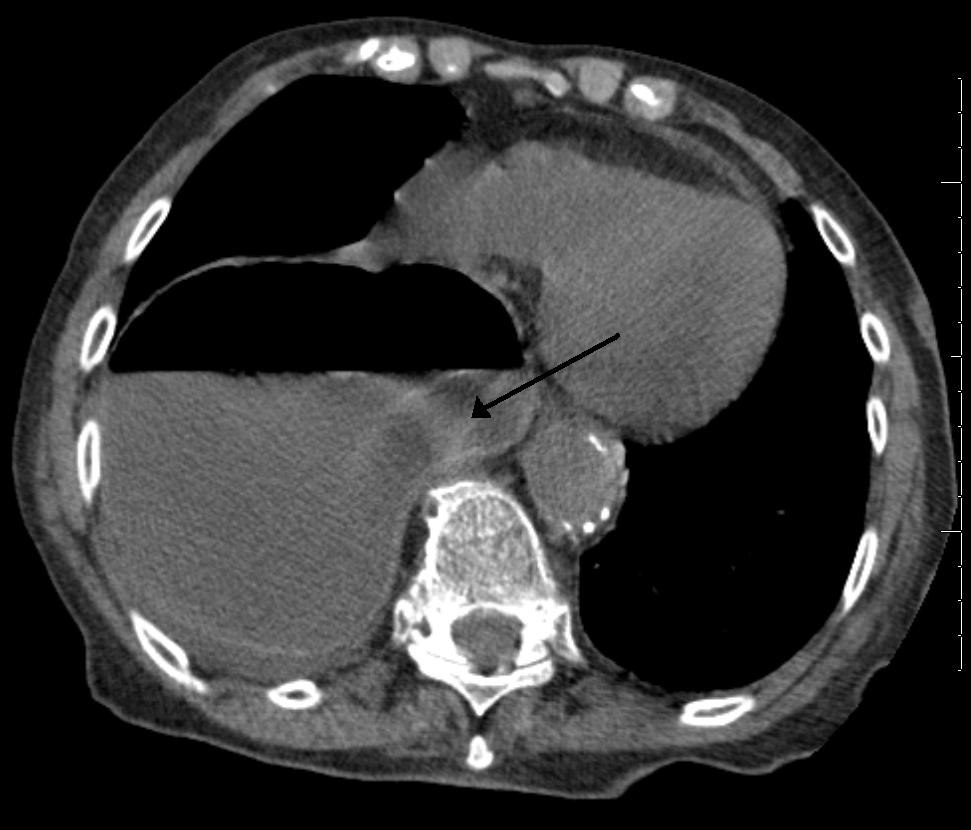
Congenital diaphragmatic hernia

In most cases, postnatal diagnosis is done and up to 2011, only four cases are reported via prenatal diagnosis. Congenital diaphragmatic hernia and intrauterine growth retardation (these two signs put the patients at the risk of afflicting with ring chromosome 15) by fetal ultrasound (Obstetric ultrasonography) at the time period of 16–24 weeks, further investigation and diagnostics (such as karyotyping) must be performed to test the possibility of ring chromosome 15.

=== Postnatal diagnosis ===
Patients could be considered to have ring chromosome 15 if they are found with: growth deficiency, café au lait spots, bone age delay, and simian crease or other dysmorphic features after birth.

== Management ==
Treatment of the disease is based on alleviating symptoms, commonly including physiotherapy, occupational therapy, and speech and language therapy. In addition, case reports have found that recombinant human growth hormone treatment may be beneficial for improving the growth velocity of patients with short stature.

== Epidemiology ==
Ring chromosome syndromes are rare congenital disorders that are likely to occur in both males and females, and the symptoms can be observed from birth since it arises during the embryonic stage. All races and ethnicities are prone to the disorders and the risk can be higher if the parents are carriers since it is genetically inherited.

Any of the 23 pairs of chromosomes can be ringed, and a recent study conducted by the 'Human Ring Chromosome Registry' in China revealed that the more frequent forms of ring chromosomes reported were 13, 15, 18, and 22.

== History ==
Ring chromosome 15 is an uncommon genetic disorder first noted by Dr. Petrea Jacobsen in 1966. As of 2005, less than 50 cases have been reported.
