= Proximal 18q- =

Proximal 18q deletion syndrome
- Specialty: Medical genetics

Proximal 18q- is a rare genetic condition caused by a deletion of genetic material within one of the two copies of chromosome 18. This deletion involves the proximal (near the centromere) section of the long arm of chromosome 18 somewhere between 18q11.2 (18.9 Mb) to 18q21.1 (43.8 Mb). Exact breakpoints vary.

== Signs and symptoms ==
Proximal 18q- causes a range of medical and developmental concerns. There is significant variation in severity due to the variation in breakpoints reported. Current research is focused on establishing genotype-phenotype correlations to enable predictive genotyping.

A group of individuals with similar deletions within this region have been described (Cody et al., 2007): The medical and developmental problems are described below.

=== Congenital anomalies ===
Clubfoot has been reported in some individuals. Although it is not a common finding, cryptorchidism has been reported in some boys.

=== Neonatal complications ===
Feedings difficulties and problems with temperature regulation have been reported in some newborns with proximal 18q-.

=== ENT ===
Recurrent otitis media is frequently associated with proximal 18q- and, in some cases, may cause conductive hearing loss. This may be resolved with the placement of PE tubes.

=== Vision ===
Many individuals with proximal 18q- have strabismus and/or refractive errors.

=== Gastrointestinal anomalies ===
Gastrointestinal anomalies are not common in people with proximal 18q-, though there has been at least one individual reported that required g-tube feedings.

=== Neurologic ===
Hypotonia is a common finding. Seizures are present in about half of individuals.

=== MRI abnormalities ===
Hypoplasia of the corpus callosum, enlarged lateral ventricles, and Virchow-Robin perivascular spaces have all been reported in people with proximal 18q-.

=== Orthopedics ===
Orthopedic anomalies are commonly seen in people with proximal 18q-. Clubfoot, pes planus, and scoliosis have all been reported.

=== Growth ===
Children with proximal 18q- are often small for their age. Unlike distal 18q-, however, growth hormone deficiency has not been reported in anyone with proximal 18q-.

=== Development ===
Proximal 18q- causes developmental disabilities. Receptive language skills tend to be more advanced and can be near normal; however, expressive language skills are usually significantly delayed.

== Genetics ==
Proximal 18q- is caused by an interstitial deletion of chromosome 18 involving the proximal region of the long arm of chromosome 18.

== Diagnosis ==
Suspicion of a chromosome abnormality is typically raised due to the presence of developmental delays. Diagnosis of proximal 18q is usually made via a routine chromosome analysis, although it may also be made by microarray analysis. Prenatal diagnosis is possible via amniocentesis or chorionic villus sampling. However, there have been multiple reports of missed prenatal diagnoses as the deletion can be difficult to identify on prenatal samples. In addition, small deletions within this region of the chromosome have been found in phenotypically normal individuals.

== Treatment ==
At present, treatment for proximal 18q- is symptomatic, meaning that the focus is on treating the signs and symptoms of the condition as they arise.

== Research ==
Currently, research is focusing on identifying the role of the genes on 18q in causing the signs and symptoms associated with proximal deletions of 18q.

== See also ==
- Distal 18q-
