= Distal 18q- =

Human disease

- Specialty: Medical genetics
- Differential diagnosis: Cri du chat syndrome Wolf-Hirschhorn syndrome

Distal 18q- is a genetic condition caused by a deletion of genetic material within one of the two copies of chromosome 18. The deletion involves the distal section of 18q and typically extends to the tip of the long arm of chromosome 18.

== Presentation ==
Distal 18q- causes a wide range of medical and developmental concerns, with significant variation in severity due to the variation in breakpoints reported in individuals with distal 18q-. Current research is focused on establishing genotype-phenotype correlations to enable predictive genotyping.

=== Congenital anomalies ===
Heart abnormalities are present in 25–35% of people with distal 18q-. The majority of these defects are septal. Congenital orthopedic anomalies are also relatively common, particularly rocker-bottom feet or clubfoot. Cleft lip and palate are relatively common in people with distal 18q-. Kidney abnormalities have also been reported and include horseshoe kidney, hydronephrosis, polycystic kidney, and absent kidney. Boys with distal 18q- may have genital anomalies, the most frequent being cryptorchidism and hypospadias.

=== Neurologic ===
Hypotonia is a common finding. Around 10% of people with distal 18q- have seizures.

=== MRI abnormalities ===
Dysmyelination is a common finding in people with distal 18q-, present in about 95%. Hypoplasia of the corpus callosum is also a common finding.

=== Vision ===
Strabismus and nystagmus are prevalent in distal 18q-. Changes in the optic nerve, as well as colobomas, are also fairly common. Myopia has been reported in some individuals.

=== Ear and sinus infections ===
Due to changes in facial structures, infants, toddlers, and children with distal 18q- often have poor drainage from the middle ears, leading to a build-up of fluid. This can in turn lead to recurrent ear and sinus infections. Antibiotics are typically required to treat these infections. In addition, the diagnosis of ear infections in children with 18q- is frequently complicated by stenosis or atresia of the ear canals, a common finding in people with distal 18q-.

=== Hearing ===
People with distal 18q- frequently have conductive and/or sensorineural hearing loss. The degree of hearing loss may vary from mild to severe.

=== Gastrointestinal ===
Individuals with distal 18q- may have problems with reflux. Hernias have also been reported.

=== Genitourinary ===
As mentioned above, males with distal 18q- may have cryptorchidism. Hypospadias and chordee have also been reported. Also, a variety of kidney malformations have been reported in infants with distal 18q-, as noted above. Additionally, vesicouretereral reflux has been diagnosed in several people with distal 18q-.

=== Orthopedics ===
As mentioned above, distal 18q- is associated with an increased incidence of clubfoot and rocker bottom feet. Also, a significant chance of developing pes planus or pes cavus exists. People with distal 18q- frequently have overlapping toes. Scoliosis and genu varum are also known orthopedic complications in children and adults with distal 18q-.

=== Growth ===
Children and adults with distal 18q- are often small for their age. Many people with distal 18q- have an abnormal response to growth hormone stimulation. Those who have been treated with growth hormone have responded well to the treatment. Microcephaly is also common in people with distal 18q-.

=== Thyroid ===
Hypothyroidism has been reported in some people with distal 18q-.

=== Immunology ===
Several people with distal 18q- have been diagnosed with low IgA levels, resulting in an increased incidence of infections.

=== Psychiatry ===
An increased incidence of psychiatric conditions occurs within the distal 18q- population. In one study, nearly 60% had depressive symptoms, 60% had symptoms of an anxiety disorder, 25% had manic symptoms, and 25% had psychotic symptoms. However, this study included young patients, many of whom were too young to exhibit signs of certain psychiatric conditions. The typical age of onset for many of these conditions appears to be during the teen years. Thus, the results of this study may actually underestimate the true incidence of psychiatric conditions within this population. Outbursts, or anger issues, such as temper tantrums are also common.

=== Cognition and adaptive skills ===
97% of individuals possess some form of intellectual disability, ranging from moderate to severe cases.

The intellectual development of individuals with distal 18q- vary quite widely. In one study of 46 individuals with distal 18q-, IQ ranged from 49 to 113, with most individuals falling in the mild to moderate range of intellectual disability. Some of those with IQ scores on the lower end of the spectrum probably actually had deletions encompassing the TCF4 gene.

An increased incidence of autism is seen within the distal 18q- population. In a recent study, 45 of 105 individuals evaluated fell into the "possible" or "very likely" levels of risk for autism. Adaptive skills may also be delayed in people with distal 18q-.

=== Dysmorphology ===
Common facial features include midfacial hypoplasia, short and downward- or upward-slanting palpebral fissures, epicanthic folds, and low-set ears with a prominent antihelix.

== Genetics ==
Distal 18q- is a deletion of the long arm of chromosome 18. The majority of deletions have breakpoints between 45,405,887 and the tip of the chromosome. There are no common breakpoints, thus the size of the deletions vary widely. The largest deletion reported is 30.076 Mb, while the smallest deletion reported to cause a clinical phenotype is 3.78 Mb.

== Diagnosis ==
Suspicion of a chromosome abnormality is typically raised due to the presence of developmental delays or birth defects. Diagnosis of distal 18q- is usually made from a blood sample. A routine chromosome analysis, or karyotype, is usually used to make the initial diagnosis, although it may also be made by microarray analysis. Increasingly, microarray analysis is also being used to clarify breakpoints. Prenatal diagnosis is possible using amniocentesis or chorionic villus sampling.

== Treatment ==
At present, treatment for distal 18q- is symptomatic, meaning the focus is on treating the signs and symptoms of the conditions as they arise. To ensure early diagnosis and treatment, people with distal 18q- are suggested to undergo routine screenings for thyroid, hearing, and vision problems.

== History ==
Distal 18q- was first described in 1964. Originally, it was called "De Grouchy syndrome" or "De Grouchy syndrome 2". Today, the preferred nomenclature for this condition is 18q-. Since this condition was originally described, researchers have clarified the size and nature of these deletions. In general, deletions of 18q fall into one of two categories: interstitial deletions, which typically have breakpoints between 18q11.2 (18.9 Mb) to 18q21.1 (43.8 Mb), and terminal deletions, which typically have a breakpoint distal to 18q21.1 (45.4 Mb) and extend to the end of the chromosome. If possible, it is preferable to indicate the general location of the deletion with the phrases "proximal 18q-" and "distal 18q-".

== Research ==
Currently, research is focusing on identifying the role of the genes on 18q in causing the signs and symptoms associated with distal deletions of 18q.

TCF4 – In 2007, deletions of or point mutations in this gene were identified as the cause of Pitt-Hopkins syndrome. This is the first gene that has been definitively shown to directly cause a clinical phenotype when deleted. If a deletion includes the TCF4 gene (located at 55,222,331-55,664,787), features of Pitt-Hopkins may be present, including abnormal corpus callosum, short neck, small penis, accessory and wide-spaced nipples, broad or clubbed fingers, and sacral dimple. Those with deletions inclusive of TCF4 have a significantly more severe cognitive phenotype.

TSHZ1 - Point mutations and deletions of this gene are linked with congenital aural atresia. Individuals with deletions inclusive of this gene have a 78% chance of having aural atresia.

Critical regions – Recent research has narrowed the critical regions for four features of the distal 18q- phenotype down to a small segment of distal 18q, although the precise genes responsible for those features remain to be identified.

The table below shows the established critical regions for four features of distal 18q-, as well as the penetrance for each of those features. The penetrance figure represents the likelihood a person would have the feature given the critical region is deleted.

Feature	Critical Region	Chromosome Bands	Penetrance
Kidney malformation	70,079,559-73,287,604	18q22.3-q23	25%
Dysmyelination	71,669,548-73,287,604	18q22.3-q23	100%
Growth hormone response failure	71,669,548-73,287,604	18q22.3-q23	90%

Haplolethal regions - Two regions on chromosome 18 have never been found to be deleted. They are located between the centromere and 22,826,284 bp (18q11.2) and between 43,832,732 and 45,297,446 bp (18q21.1). The genes in these regions are thought to be lethal when deleted.

== See also ==
- Proximal 18q-
