= Sergei Navashin =

Russian biologist

Sergei Gavrilovich Navashin
- Сергей Гаврилович Навашин
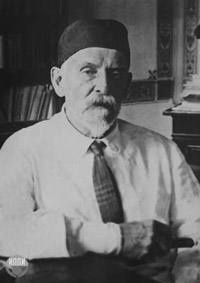
- Sergei Gavrilovich Navashin
- Born: 14 December 1857
- Died: 10 December 1930 (aged 72)
- Known for: Discovery of double fertilization in flowering plants
- Children: Mikhail Sergeevich Navashin
- Scientific career
- Fields: Botany, cytology
- Author abbrev. (botany): Navashin

Sergei Gavrilovich Navashin (Russian: Сергей Гаврилович Навашин; 14 December 1857 – 10 December 1930) was a Russian and Soviet botanist and cytologist. In 1898 he discovered double fertilization in flowering plants, a fundamental process in angiosperm reproduction. His work played a major role in the development of plant cytology and embryology.

== Biography ==
Navashin was born in Tsarevshin in the Saratov Governorate of the Russian Empire. The son of a physician, he graduated from the Saratov Gymnasium in 1874 and entered the Medical-Surgical Academy in Saint Petersburg. He initially studied chemistry in the laboratory of Alexander Borodin. In 1878 he transferred to Moscow University and received a Candidate degree in biology in 1881. Influenced by Kliment Timiryazev and V. Zinger, he turned to the study of botany.

He later served as a laboratory assistant in the chair of plant physiology at the Petrovskaya Agricultural Academy. After the closure of the academy in 1888 he worked at St. Petersburg University as an assistant to Alexander Borodin.

In 1894 Navashin defended his master's thesis in botany and was appointed professor of botany at Kiev University, where he also directed the university botanical garden. During his years in Kiev he carried out his most important research in plant cytology and embryology, including the discovery of chalazogamy in several tree species and, in 1898, the discovery of double fertilization in flowering plants.

In 1915 illness forced him to leave Kiev for the warmer climate of Tbilisi, where he later served as professor at Tbilisi University from 1918 to 1923. In 1923 he founded the Timiryazev Biological Institute in Moscow, which he directed until 1929.

His son, Mikhail Sergeevich Navashin (1896–1973), was also a cytologist and geneticist.
