= Lilian Vaughan Morgan =

American geneticist

- Born: Lilian Vaughan Sampson; July 7, 1870; Hallowell, Maine
- Died: December 6, 1952 (aged 82); Los Angeles, California
- Other name: Lilian Vaughan Sampson
- Education: Bryn Mawr (B.S.), (M.S.)
- Known for: Discovery of attached-X chromosomes, discovery of ring chromosomes
- Spouse: Thomas Hunt Morgan
- Scientific career
- Fields: Genetics
- Workplaces: Bryn Mawr College; Columbia University; California Institute of Technology

Lilian Vaughan Morgan (née Sampson; July 7, 1870 – December 6, 1952) was an American experimental biologist who made seminal contributions to the genetics of the fruit fly Drosophila melanogaster, although her work was obscured by the attention given to her husband, Nobel laureate Thomas Hunt Morgan. Lilian Morgan published sixteen single-author papers between 1894 and 1947. Probably her most significant scientific contribution was the discovery of the attached-X chromosome and an entirely new pattern of inheritance in Drosophila in 1921. She later described a ring-X chromosome in Drosophila melanogaster in 1933, an early example of a ring chromosome in animals. Ring chromosomes had previously been described in plants by Mikhail Sergeevich Navashin in 1930 and were subsequently studied in maize by Barbara McClintock in the early 1930s.

== Early life ==
Morgan was born in 1870 in Hallowell, Maine. She was orphaned at the age of three when her parents and younger sister died of tuberculosis. After the death of her parents, Morgan and her older sister Edith were raised by her maternal grandparents in Germantown, Pennsylvania.

== Early research career ==
Morgan enrolled as an undergraduate student at Bryn Mawr in 1887. She majored in biology and was advised by Martha Carey Thomas. After graduating with honors in 1891, she spent the summer at the Marine Biological Laboratory in Woods Hole, Massachusetts, where Edmund Beecher Wilson, one of her previous zoology professors, introduced her to her future graduate advisor and husband, Thomas Hunt Morgan.

In the autumn of 1891, Morgan earned a fellowship, which enabled her to study the musculature of chitons at the University of Zurich with Arnold Lang, a comparative anatomist and student of Ernst Haeckel. She returned to Bryn Mawr in 1892, where she earned a Master of Science in biology in 1894, under the advisory of Thomas Morgan. After graduation, she published her work on the musculature of chitons, returned to Woods Hole as an independent investigator, and spent many summers investigating breeding, development and embryology in amphibians.

== Family life ==
In 1904, at the age of 34, she married Thomas Hunt Morgan and moved to New York City, where Thomas Morgan began working at Columbia University. They spent the following summer in California, where she researched and published work on planarian regeneration at the Stanford Marine Laboratory. She would not publish another paper for sixteen years.

During the years following her marriage, she supported her husband's career and raised four children: Howard Key Morgan, born 1906; Edith Sampson Morgan, born 1907; Lilian Vaughan Morgan, born 1910; and Isabella Merrick Morgan, born 1911. Shine and Wrobel (1976) note that one key to Thomas Hunt Morgan's success was that his personal affairs were entirely handled by Lilian Morgan, freeing him to focus on his research. The family spent their winters in New York and returned in the summers to Woods Hole, where she maintained a summer house for her children, relatives and her husband's graduate students. She maintained this house for many years, eventually equipping it for science lessons for children.

== Involvement in science education ==
With several other women, Morgan founded the Summer School Club at Woods Hole in 1913, which is now the Children's School of Science, and served as its first educational chairperson and Science Committee Chair in 1914. She preferred working outdoors with children to conduct experiments and discuss problems.

== Later research career ==
After her children were old enough, Morgan returned to the laboratory to study Drosophila genetics. Her husband, T.H. Morgan, encouraged her but did not collaborate with her. Instead, he gave her working space in his laboratory, called the "Fly Room," at Columbia University, where she maintained her own Drosophila stocks but held no official position. Her husband and the other male scientists never became comfortable with her presence in the lab, whose atmosphere was "a little like that of an exclusive men's club." Morgan may also have felt isolated because she was older than the other women and was neither outgoing nor talkative, according to Alfred Sturtevant. Because she didn't hold an official position, she never attended a scientific meeting and never presented a paper at a conference.

=== Major research accomplishments ===
==== The attached-X chromosome ====
While working in the Fly Room at Columbia University, Morgan spotted an unusual fruit fly. She captured it and mated it with a normal male. She analyzed her data and discovered both an unusual chromosome and a new pattern of inheritance. This discovery became a powerful tool for X chromosome analysis. It provided further confirmation of the chromosome theory, sex determination, the linkage of traits on sex chromosomes, and an important tool for isolating and preserving traits on the X chromosome. After 100 years the attached-X strain continues to be used in genetics research and the new inheritance pattern, non-criss-cross inheritance, is taught in genetics courses and illustrated in genetics textbooks.

==== The ring-X chromosome ====
Another major contribution to Drosophila genetics was Lilian Morgan's description of the ring-X chromosome in Drosophila melanogaster. Ring chromosomes had previously been described in plants by Mikhail S. Navashin in 1930 in species of Crepis, and were subsequently studied in maize by Barbara McClintock in the early 1930s. Morgan had earlier reported an unusual X chromosome with an “almost or entirely closed” U-shaped structure in 1926, a finding later interpreted as an early observation of a ring chromosome.

Morgan identified ring chromosomes through unusual patterns of recombination observed in an attached-X stock of Drosophila. Cytological analysis revealed that the X chromosome had become circularized. Ring-X chromosomes are unstable during early development and often produce genetic mosaics—individuals containing cells with different genetic constitutions. In females, for example, some cells may be XO while others are XX. Ring chromosomes subsequently became important tools for studying chromosome behavior and developmental genetics.

== Later life ==
Morgan and her family moved to California in 1928, where she continued her Drosophila research at the California Institute of Technology in Pasadena while her husband Thomas Hunt Morgan became the division head. Her husband died in 1945; one year afterwards, Morgan received her first official appointment as a research associate at the age of 76. She died in 1952 at the age of 82 in Los Angeles.

On August 30, 2025 the family of Lilian Vaughan Morgan and her husband Thomas Hunt Morgan transferred their cremains from the Mountain View Mausoleum in Altadena, California to the Woods Hole Community Cemetery in Woods Hole, Massachusetts. The community cemetery is managed by the Church of the Messiah.

== Publications ==
- Sampson, L. V. 1894. Die Muskulatur von Chiton. Jenaischen Zeitschrift für Naturwissenschaft 28: 460–468.
- Sampson, L. V. 1895. The musculature of chiton. Journal of Morphology 11:595-628.
- Sampson, L. V. 1900. Unusual modes of breeding and development among anura. Amer. Naturalist 34:687-715.
- Sampson, L. V. 1904. A contribution to the embryology of Hylodes martinicensis. Araer. J. Anat. 3: 473–504.
- Morgan, L. V. 1905. Incomplete anterior regeneration in the absence of the brain in Leploplana litloralis. Biol. Bull. 9:187-193.
- Morgan, L. V. 1906. Regeneration of grafted pieces of planarians. J. Exp. Zool. 3:269-294.
- Morgan, L. V. 1922. Non-criss-cross inheritance in Drosophila melanogaster. Biol. Bull. 42:267-274.
- Morgan, L. V. 1925. Polyploidy in Drosophila melanogaster with two attached X chromosomes" Genetics 10:148-178.
- Morgan, L. V. 1926. Correlation between shape and behavior of a chromosome" Proc. Natl. Acad. Sci 12:180-181.
- Morgan, L. V. 1929. Composites of Drosophila melanogaster. Carnegie Inst. of Wash. Publ. No. 399: 225–296.
- Morgan, L. V. 1931. Proof that bar changes to notbar by unequal crossing-over" Proc. Natl. Acad. Sci 17:270-272.
- Morgan, L. V. 1933. A closed X chromosome in Drosophila melanogaster" Genetics 18:250-283.
- Morgan, L. V. 1938a. Origin of attached-X chromosomes in Drosophila melanogaster and the occurrence of non-disjunction of X's in the male. Amer. Naturalist 72:434-446.
- Morgan, L. V. 1938b. Effects of a compound duplication of the X chromosome of Drosophila melanogaster" Genetics 23:423-462.
- Morgan, L. V. 1939. A spontaneous somatic exchange between non-homologous chromosomes in Drosophila melanogaster" Genetics 24:747-752.
- Morgan, L. V. 1947. A variable phenotype associated with the fourth chromosome of Drosophila melanogaster and affected by heterochromatin" Genetics 32:200-219.
- Morgan, T. H., H. Redfield, and L. V. Morgan. 1943. Maintenance of a Drosophila stock center, in connection with investigations on the germinal material in relation to heredity. Carnegie Inst. Wash. Yearbk. 42:171-174.
- Morgan, T. H., A. H. Sturtevant, and L. V. Morgan. 1945. Maintenance of a Drosophila stock center, in connection with investigations on the germinal material in relation to heredity. Carnegie Inst. Wash. Yearbk. 44:157-160.
