= Mikhail Navashin =

Soviet cytologist and cytogeneticist (1896–1973)

Mikhail Sergeevich Navashin
- Михаил Сергеевич Навашин
- Born: February 27, 1896
- Died: September 28, 1973 (aged 77)
- Education: University of California, Berkeley (PhD)
- Known for: Discovery of ring chromosomes; research on chromosome translocations and amphiplasty
- Scientific career
- Fields: Cytology, cytogenetics

Mikhail Sergeevich Navashin (Russian: Михаил Сергеевич Навашин; 27 February 1896 – 28 September 1973) was a Soviet cytologist and cytogeneticist known for his work on plant chromosomes and chromosome evolution. He was among the first researchers to demonstrate chromosomal translocations in plants and proposed a hypothesis linking translocations to changes in basic chromosome numbers during evolution. Navashin is also known for providing the first explicit cytological description of ring chromosomes in plants, reported in 1930 in species of the genus Crepis. Ring chromosomes were subsequently described in animals by Lilian Vaughan Morgan in Drosophila melanogaster and analyzed in detail in maize by Barbara McClintock in the early 1930s.

== Biography ==
Navashin was born in Kyiv in 1896, the son of the botanist Sergei Navashin. In 1918 he graduated from the agronomy faculty of the Kyiv Polytechnic Institute.

From 1920 to 1924 he worked at the Tbilisi Polytechnic Institute. Between 1924 and 1937 he was affiliated with the Timiryazev Biological Institute in Moscow. From 1927 to 1929 he worked abroad in the laboratory of Ernest B. Babcock at the University of California, Berkeley, where he conducted cytological research on species of Crepis. Navashin came to Berkeley on an International Education Board fellowship and remained for nearly three years, earning a PhD while collaborating with Babcock on cytogenetic studies of the genus Crepis. Their collaboration culminated in a monographic treatment of the genus published in 1930.

From 1934 to 1937 Navashin served as director of the Moscow University Botanical Garden. From 1937 to 1941 he worked at the Institute of Genetics of the Academy of Sciences of the USSR. During 1941–1948 he worked at the Institute of Cytology, Histology, and Embryology of the Academy of Sciences.

From 1948 to 1969 he worked at the Komarov Botanical Institute. In 1955 he became head of the Department of Genetics and Plant Breeding at Leningrad State University. In the same year he was among the signatories of the Letter of Three Hundred, which criticized the dominance of Trofim Lysenko and Lysenkoism in Soviet biology.

In the final years of his career, from 1969 until his death in 1973, Navashin worked at the Semenov Institute of Chemical Physics of the Academy of Sciences.

He died in Moscow on 28 September 1973 and was buried at Peredelkino Cemetery.

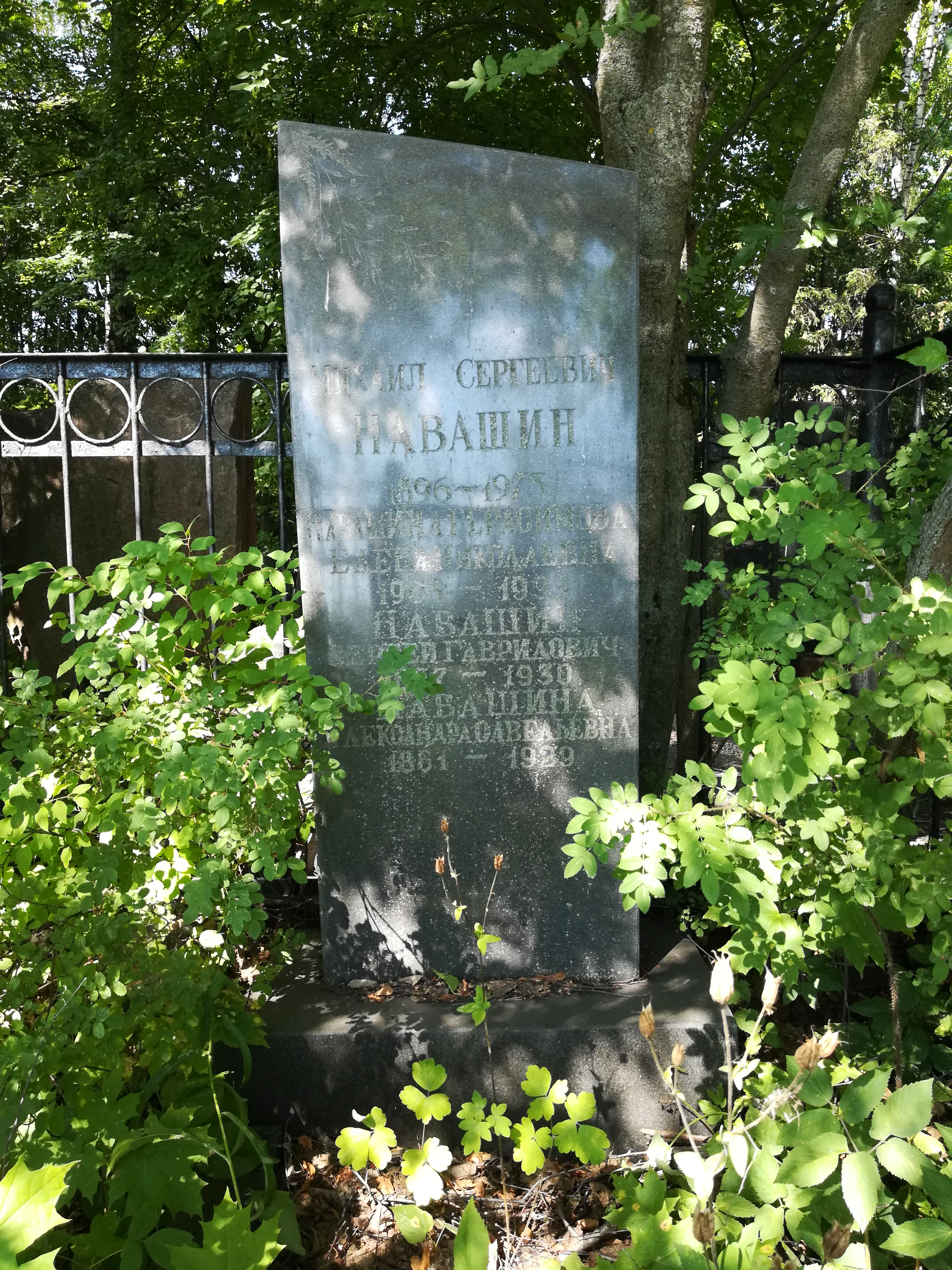
Navashin's grave at Peredelkino Cemetery in Moscow

== Scientific work ==
Navashin's research focused primarily on the cytogenetics of plants. His early work investigated chromosome morphology, hybridization, and chromosomal variation in species of Crepis. In 1930 he reported the occurrence of ring-shaped chromosomes formed when the ends of a chromosome fuse to create a closed circular structure. This discovery represented one of the earliest descriptions of ring chromosomes in cytogenetics. Navashin's report of ring chromosomes in Crepis was cited by Barbara McClintock in her early cytogenetic studies of maize, and later historical accounts note that Navashin had described ring chromosomes in plants prior to McClintock's work.

Navashin also described the phenomenon of amphiplasty, in which hybridization alters the morphology of chromosomes relative to those of the parental species. His work contributed to understanding chromosome structural variation and the role of polyploidy and chromosomal rearrangements in plant evolution.

Through experimental hybridization studies he demonstrated cases in which morphological traits of hybrid plants were determined by the nuclear genome rather than the cytoplasm.

Navashin later organized large-scale studies compiling chromosome numbers across flowering plants of the world, culminating in a comprehensive reference work on chromosome numbers in angiosperms.

== Amateur astronomy ==
Navashin was also an enthusiast of amateur astronomy. His book Samodel'nyi teleskop-reflektor (“Homemade Reflecting Telescope”), first published in 1953, provided detailed instructions for constructing a reflecting telescope and became widely used among amateur astronomers in the Soviet Union.

He led the technical section on amateur telescope construction in the Moscow branch of the All-Union Astronomical and Geodetic Society and in 1970 was elected an honorary member of the society.

== Honors and recognition ==
Navashin was elected a member of the German Academy of Natural Scientists Leopoldina in 1965. In 1970 he became an honorary member of the All-Union Astronomical and Geodetic Society.

The asteroid 4472 Navashin was named in his honor in 1994.

== Personal life ==
His father, Sergei Navashin was a noted botanist and cytologist who discovered double fertilization in flowering plants.

His son, Sergei Mikhailovich Navashin (1924–1998), was a microbiologist and a member of the Academy of Medical Sciences of the USSR.
