= Letter of Three Hundred =

1955 scientific memorandum against Lysenkoism

The Letter of Three Hundred (Russian: Письмо трёхсот) was a series of letters sent by Soviet scientists to the Presidium of the Central Committee of the Communist Party of the Soviet Union in 1955, calling for an end to the dominance of Trofim Lysenko's doctrine in Soviet biology. The first and most important of these letters was a 21-page memorandum signed by a large group of Soviet scientists and sent on 11 October 1955. The memorandum assessed the state of biology in the Soviet Union in the mid-1950s and sharply criticized the scientific views and practical activities of Lysenko, who at the time was one of the country’s most influential figures in biological science. It ultimately contributed to Lysenko’s resignation as president of VASKhNIL and to the removal of some of his supporters from other leading posts in the Soviet scientific establishment. The text of the letter, with some cuts, was first openly published in Pravda on 13 January 1989.

== Background ==
In the late 1940s and early 1950s, with the support of the leadership of the Communist Party of the Soviet Union and the Soviet state, Lysenko expanded and promoted his theories through ideological and pseudoscientific rhetoric, advanced his supporters, and moved against his opponents. Scientific debate in biology was effectively prohibited during the period of Lysenko’s dominance, and his opponents were isolated, removed from positions, and in some cases physically repressed.

By the mid-1950s, many Soviet scientists had come to believe that decades of Lysenko’s monopoly had done severe damage not only to biological science but also to the international prestige of the Soviet Union. At a time when physics and chemistry were advancing rapidly in the Soviet Union and abroad, and when genetics and molecular biology were making major international advances through discoveries in radiation biology, the structure of DNA, and the mechanisms of genetic replication and information transfer, Lysenko’s claims and repeated promises of success for “Michurinist biology” increasingly appeared sterile and scientifically untenable.

After the death of Joseph Stalin, opposition to Lysenko in Soviet biology revived. Biologists committed to classical genetics had previously sent many private letters to the Soviet leadership, including to the Central Committee, the Council of Ministers of the Soviet Union, and even the Soviet procuracy, describing the damage caused by Lysenko and his associates. When these individual appeals produced no response, the idea emerged of a collective letter signed by a large number of scientists.

== Discussion and consequences ==
Nikita Khrushchev, who personally sympathized with Lysenko, reportedly described the letter as “outrageous” after learning of it. At the same time, Vsevolod Stoletov, then first deputy minister of higher education of the Soviet Union, proposed that Khrushchev organize a broad scientific discussion in which the supporters of the officially approved doctrine would supposedly prevail and demonstrate their correctness. Instead, the discussion expanded support for the letter’s authors within scientific circles and contributed to the near-total isolation of Lysenko, despite his continuing political backing.

The letter contributed to Lysenko’s resignation as president of VASKhNIL in 1956, although he later regained influence under Khrushchev. After Khrushchev’s fall from power in 1964, Lysenko’s position weakened decisively, and in 1965 he was removed from the Institute of Genetics.

== Signatories and supporters ==
The memorandum was signed by a large group of Soviet scientists, including biologists as well as prominent figures from related fields such as physics, mathematics, and chemistry.

Among the signatories were biologists such as Boris Astaurov, Nikolai Dubinin, Vladimir Sukachev, Nikolai Timofeev-Ressovsky, Nikolai Nasonov, and Mikhail Navashin, together with scientists from other disciplines including Lev Landau, Igor Tamm, Vitaly Ginzburg, Yakov Zeldovich, Pyotr Kapitsa, Andrei Sakharov, Mstislav Keldysh, Sergei Sobolev, Pavel Alexandrov, and Alexander Frumkin.

Additional supporting statements were submitted by other scientists and specialist groups, including representatives of mathematics, physics, and agricultural science.
