= Chromosome abnormality =

Abnormal number or structure of chromosomes

A chromosomal abnormality or chromosomal anomaly is a missing, extra, or irregular portion of chromosomal DNA. These can occur in the form of numerical abnormalities, where there is an atypical number of chromosomes, or as structural abnormalities, where one or more individual chromosomes are altered. Chromosome mutation was formerly used in a strict sense to mean a change in a chromosomal segment, involving more than one gene. Chromosome anomalies usually occur when there is an error in cell division following meiosis or mitosis. Chromosome abnormalities may be detected or confirmed by comparing an individual's karyotype, or full set of chromosomes, to a typical karyotype for the species via genetic testing.

Sometimes chromosomal abnormalities arise in the early stages of an embryo, sperm, or infant. They can be caused by various environmental factors. The implications of chromosomal abnormalities depend on the specific problem, they may have quite different ramifications. Diseases and conditions caused by chromosomal abnormalities are called chromosomal disorders or chromosomal aberrations. Some examples are Down syndrome and Turner syndrome. However, chromosomal abnormalities do not always lead to diseases. Among abnormalities, structural rearrangements of genes between chromosomes can be harmless if they are balanced, which means that a set of the chromosomes remains complete and there are no gene breaks across the chromosomes.

== Numerical abnormality ==
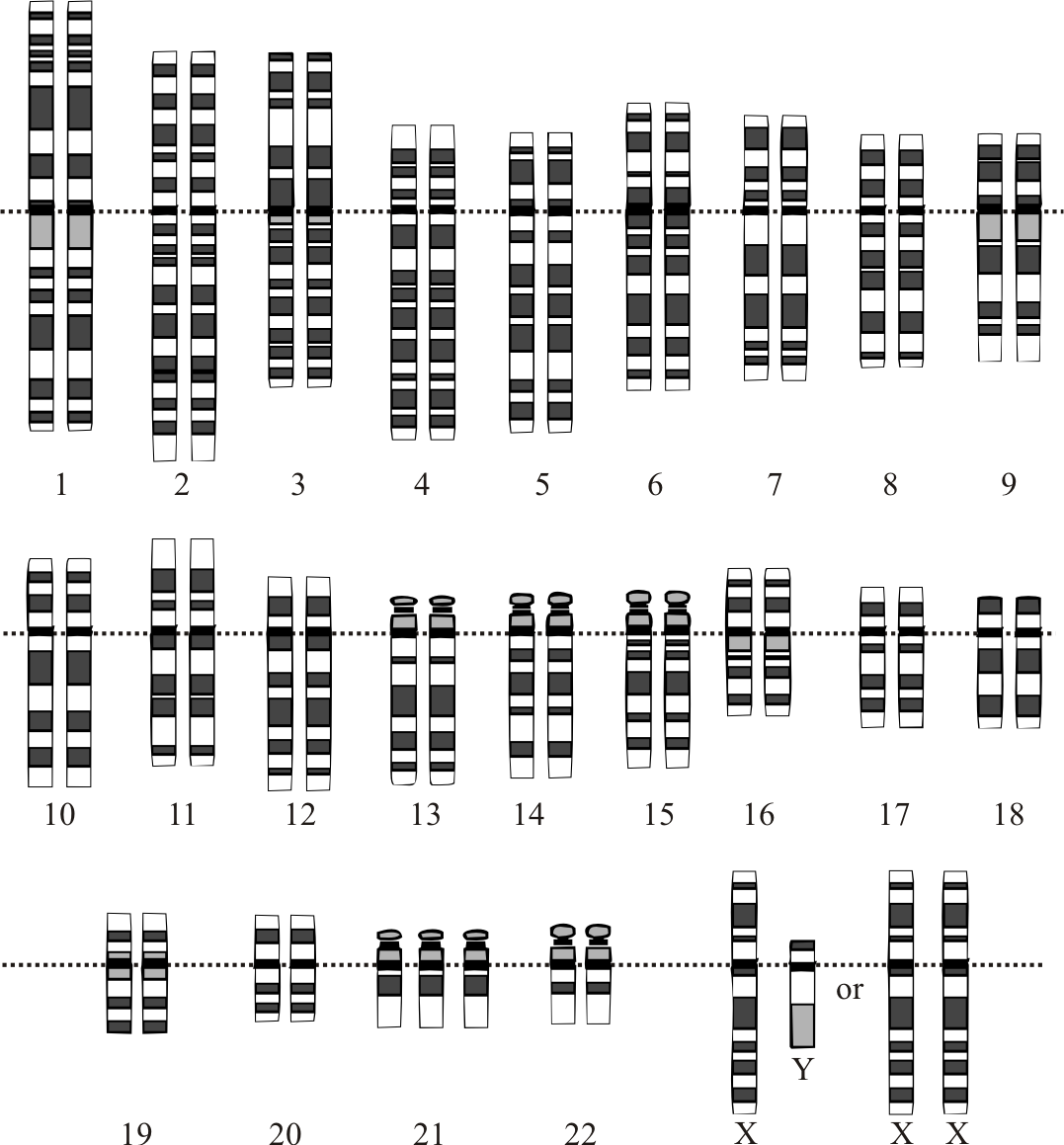
A karyotype of an individual with trisomy 21, showing three copies of chromosome 21.

Error within meiosis segregation resulting in tetraploid daughter cells with 4 sets of chromosomes instead of two

Maintaining a euploid state, where cells contain the correct number of chromosome sets, is essential for genomic stability. Aneuploidy, characterized by an abnormal number of chromosomes, occurs when an individual is missing a chromosome from a pair (monosomy) or has an additional chromosome (trisomy). This may be either full, involving a whole chromosome, or partial, where only part of a chromosome is missing or added. Aneuploidy may arise from meiosis segregation errors such as nondisjunction, premature disjunction, or anaphase lag during meiosis I or II. For aneuploidy, nondisjunction, the most frequent error, particularly in oocyte formation, occurs when replicated chromosomes fail to separate properly, leading to germ cells with an extra or missing chromosome. Additionally, polyploidy occurs when cells contain more than two sets of chromosomes. Polyploidy encompasses various forms, including triploid (three sets of chromosomes) and tetraploid (four sets of chromosomes). Tetraploidy often arises from developmental errors during mitosis, such as cytokinesis failure, endoreplication, mitotic slippage, and cell fusion. These errors can subsequently lead to aneuploidy.

A karyotype of an individual with Turner Syndrome, where there is only a single X chromosome.

Aneuploidy can occur with sex chromosomes or autosomes. Rather than having monosomy, or only one copy, the majority of aneuploid people have trisomy, or three copies of one chromosome. An example of trisomy in humans is Down syndrome, which is a developmental disorder caused by an extra copy of chromosome 21; the disorder is therefore also called "trisomy 21". An example of monosomy in humans is Turner syndrome, where the individual is born with only one sex chromosome, an X.

=== Sperm aneuploidy ===
Exposure of males to certain lifestyle, environmental and/or occupational hazards may increase the risk of aneuploid spermatozoa. In particular, risk of aneuploidy is increased by tobacco smoking, and occupational exposure to benzene, insecticides, and perfluorinated compounds. Increased aneuploidy is often associated with increased DNA damage in spermatozoa.

== Structural abnormalities ==
The three major single-chromosome mutations: deletion (1), duplication (2) and inversion (3).

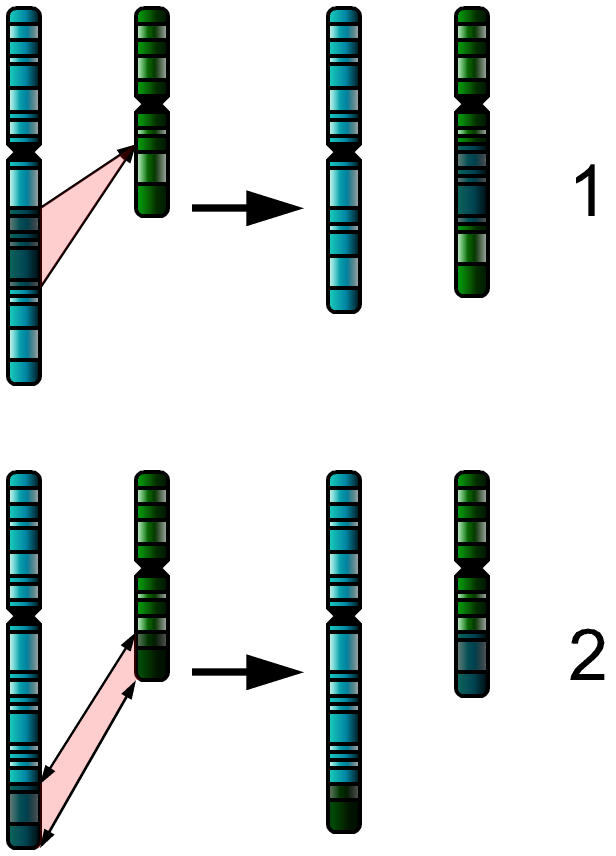
The two major two-chromosome mutations: insertion (1) and translocation (2).

Structural abnormalities in chromosomes may result from breakage and improper realignment of chromosome segments. When the structure of a chromosome is altered, it can result in unbalanced rearrangements, balanced rearrangements, ring chromosomes, and isochromosomes. To expand, these abnormalities may be defined as follows:

- Unbalanced rearrangements includes missing or additional genetic information in chromosomes. They include:
  - Deletions: A portion of the chromosome is missing or has been deleted. Known disorders in humans include Wolf–Hirschhorn syndrome, which is caused by partial deletion of the short arm of chromosome 4; and Jacobsen syndrome, also called the terminal 11q deletion disorder.
  - Duplications: A portion of the chromosome has been duplicated, resulting in extra genetic material. Known human disorders include Charcot–Marie–Tooth disease type 1A, which may be caused by duplication of the gene encoding peripheral myelin protein 22 (PMP22) on chromosome 17.
  - Insertions: A portion of one chromosome has been deleted from its normal place and inserted into another chromosome.
- Balanced rearrangements includes the alteration of chromosome segments but the genetic information is not lost or gained. They include:
  - Inversions: A portion of the chromosome has broken off, turned upside down, and reattached, therefore the genetic material is inverted.
  - Translocations: A portion of one chromosome has been transferred to another chromosome. There are two main types of translocations:
    - Reciprocal translocation: Segments from two different chromosomes have been exchanged.
    - Robertsonian translocation: A pair of chromosomes break at their centromeres, lose their short p arms, and fuse at their q arms, forming a single chromosome with one centromere. This type of translocation typically occurs between chromosomes 13, 14, 15, 21, and 22 in humans.

Robertsonian translocation. Two chromosomes with the removal of their p (short) arms, and fusion at the centromere with their q (long) arms.

- Rings: A portion of a chromosome (the ends) has broken off and formed a circle or ring. This happens with or without the loss of genetic material.

Formation of a ring chromosome

- Extrachromosomal DNA (ecDNA): 100 kb to 5 Mb-sized circular DNA molecules found in the nucleus that undergo non-Mendelian inheritance and do not have detectable centromeric activity. A primary mechanism for ecDNA formation is chromothripsis. Since ecDNA can reach high copy numbers and possesses highly-accessible chromatin, it can drive massive oncogene expression in cancer and is associated with poor clinical outcomes
- Isochromosome: Formed by the mirror image copy of a chromosome segment including the centromere. Specifically, they form when one arm of a chromosome is lost, and the remaining arm duplicates.

Isochromosome formation

Chromosome instability syndromes are a group of disorders characterized by chromosomal instability and breakage. They often lead to an increased tendency to develop certain types of malignancies.

== Inheritance ==
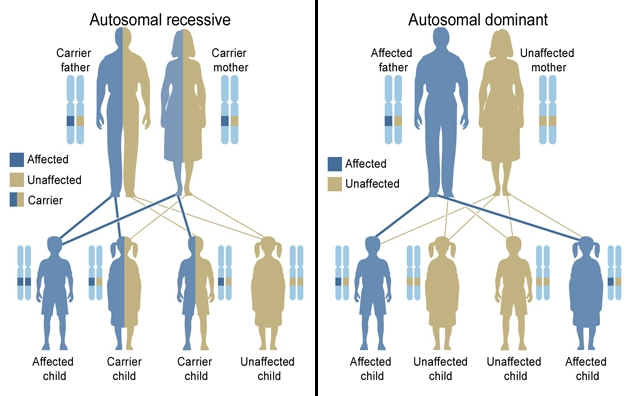
Autosomal dominant and autosomal recessive inheritance patterns

Constitutional chromosome abnormalities (present at beginning of development) arise during gametogenesis or embryogenesis, affecting a significant proportion of an organism's cells. These inherited abnormalities most commonly occur as errors in the egg or sperm, meaning the anomaly is present in every cell of the body. Factors such as maternal age and environmental influences contribute to the occurrence of these genetic errors. Offspring inherit two copies of each gene, one from each parent, and mutations (often caused by disease) may be passed down through generations. The diseases that follow a single-gene inheritance pattern are relatively rare but affect millions of individuals. This can be represented through the Mendelian inheritance patterns:

X-linked dominant inheritance patterns, differing between maternal and paternal origin, on offspring

- Autosomal dominant: Where at least one affected parent passes the mutation, and the condition appears in every generation. Examples include Huntington's disease, achondroplasia, and neurofibromatosis.

X-linked recessive inheritance patterns, differing between maternal and paternal origin, on offspring

- Autosomal recessive: Both parents are carriers of the mutation (though it may not appear in every generation). The disorder manifests only when both copies of the inherited gene are mutated. Examples include tay-Sachs disease, sickle cell anemia, and cystic fibrosis.
- X-linked inheritance: Mutated X chromosomes may be inherited in a dominant or recessive manner. Within X-linked recessive inheritance, males are more frequently affected than females. Since males have only one X chromosome, they will express the disease if that single X carries the mutation. Examples include hemophilia and fabry disease. In contrast, females, with two X chromosomes, must inherit the mutated gene from both parents for the disorder to manifest. X-linked dominant diseases can affect both males and females. A father with an X-linked dominant trait may only pass it to his daughters, while a mother can pass the trait to both sons and daughters. An example of this is incontinentia pigmenti.

Mitochondrial inheritance pattern and its implication on offspring from a maternal and paternal origin.

- Mitochondrial inheritance: This pattern affects both males and females but is inherited and passed only through the mother. Examples include Leber's hereditary optic neuropathy and Kearns-Sayre syndrome.

Given these patterns of inheritance, chromosome studies are often conducted on parents when a child is found to have a chromosomal anomaly. If the parents do not exhibit the abnormality, it was not inherited but may be passed down in subsequent generations.

Chromosomal abnormalities can also arise from de novo mutations within an individual. De novo mutations are spontaneous, somatic mutations that occur without prior inheritance, and they can emerge at various stages of life, including during the parental germline, embryonic or fetal development, or later in life due to aging. These mutations may occur during gametogenesis or postzygotically, resulting in new mutations that appear in a single generation without prior evidence of mutation in the parental chromosomes. Approximately 7% of de novo mutations are present as high-level mosaic mutations. Genetic mosaicism, which refers to a post-zygotic mutation, occurs when an individual possesses two or more genetically distinct cell populations derived from a single fertilized egg. This can lead to chromosomal abnormalities, and these mutations may be present in somatic cells, germ cells, or both, in the case of gonosomal mosaicism, where mutations exist in both somatic and germline cells. Somatic mosaicism involves multiple cell lineages in somatic cells, while germline mosaicism occurs in multiple lineages within germline cells, allowing the mutation to be passed to offspring. An example of a chromosomal abnormality resulting from genetic mosaicism is Turner syndrome.

== Acquired chromosome abnormalities ==
Acquired chromosomal abnormalities represent genetic alterations that manifest during an individual's lifetime, as opposed to being inherited from their parents. These modifications predominantly occur within somatic cells and are characterized by their non-heritable nature. Typically, they arise from mutations that transpire during the process of DNA replication or as a consequence of exposure to various environmental factors. In contrast to constitutional chromosomal abnormalities, which are present at birth, acquired abnormalities occur during adulthood and are confined to specific clones of cells, thereby inhibiting their distribution throughout the body.

The development of chromosomal abnormalities and malignancies can be attributed to environmental exposures or may occur spontaneously during DNA replication. Spontaneous replication errors typically occur due to DNA polymerase synthesizing new polynucleotides while evading proofreading functions, leading to mismatches in base pairing. Throughout a human's lifetime, individuals may encounter mutagens (which are agents that induce mutations) that lead to chromosomal mutations. These mutations arise when a mutagen interacts with parental DNA, typically affecting one strand, resulting in structural alterations that hinder the successful base pairing with the modified nucleotide. Consequently, daughter molecules inherit these mutations, which may further accumulate additional damage, subsequently being passed down to the next generations of cells. Mutagens can be classified as physical, chemical, or biological:

- Chemical: Common chemical mutagens include base analogs (molecules that resemble nitrogenous bases), deaminating agents (which remove amino groups), alkylating agents, and intercalating agents.
- Physical: The most prevalent sources of physical mutagens are exposure to UV radiation, which induces dimerization of adjacent pyrimidine bases, and ionizing radiation, which typically causes point mutations, insertions, or deletions. Heat can also function as a mutagen by promoting the cleavage of the β-N-glycosidic bond, which connects the base to the sugar part of the nucleotide, through water-induced processes.
- Biological: Biological mutagens are introduced through exposure to viruses, bacteria, and/or transposons and insertion sequences (IS). Transposons and IS can move through DNA by 'jumping,' disrupting the functionality of chromosomal DNA. The insertion of viral DNA can lead to genetic disruption, while bacteria may produce reactive oxygen species (ROS) that cause inflammation and DNA damage, resulting in decreased repair efficiency.

Sporadic cancers are those that develop due to mutations that are not inherited; in these cases, normal cells gradually accumulate mutations and cellular damage. Most cancers, if not all, could cause chromosome abnormalities, with either the formation of hybrid genes and fusion proteins, deregulation of genes and overexpression of proteins, or loss of tumor suppressor genes (see the "Mitelman Database" and the Atlas of Genetics and Cytogenetics in Oncology and Haematology,). Approximately 90% of cancers exhibit chromosomal instability (CIN), characterized by the frequent gain or loss of entire chromosome segments. This phenomenon contributes to tumor aneuploidy and intra-tumor heterogeneity, which are commonly observed in most human cancers. For instance, certain consistent chromosomal abnormalities can turn normal cells into a leukemic cell such as the translocation of a gene, resulting in its inappropriate expression.

== DNA damage during spermatogenesis ==
DNA damage during spermatogenesis plays a crucial role in chromosomal abnormalities and male fertility. In the early stages of sperm development, DNA repair mechanisms such as homologous recombination (HR) and mismatch repair (MMR) efficiently correct replication errors and double-strand breaks (DSBs). However, as spermatogenesis progresses, DNA repair capacity declines due to changes in how DNA is packaged inside sperm cells.

Spermatogenesis occurs in three phases: mitosis (spermatocytogenesis), meiosis, and spermiogenesis. During spermiogenesis, the DNA becomes more tightly packed to fit inside the sperm head. This happens because histone proteins, which normally help organize DNA, are replaced with transition proteins (TNP1, TNP2) and then protamines (PRM1, PRM2). While this packaging protects the DNA, it also makes it harder for repair enzymes to fix any damage. As a result, non-homologous end joining (NHEJ), an error-prone repair process, becomes the main repair mechanism, increasing the risk of mutations.

Oxidative stress is another major factor contributing to DNA damage in sperm cells. Reactive oxygen species (ROS), produced both inside sperm and from external sources such as immune cells in seminal fluid, can break DNA strands. High ROS levels can overwhelm antioxidant defences, leading to further damage and triggering cell death pathways.

Normally, defective sperm cells are removed through apoptosis, a controlled cell death process. However, if this system fails—such as when there is an imbalance between pro-apoptotic (BAX) and anti-apoptotic (BCL-2) factors—damaged sperm may survive. If these sperm fertilize an egg, the oocyte's repair mechanisms may attempt to fix the damage.

The maternal repair machinery is capable of correcting sperm DNA damage post-fertilization, but errors in this process can result in chromosomal structural aberrations in the developing zygote. Notably, exposure to DNA-damaging agents, such as the chemotherapy drug Melphalan, can induce inter-strand DNA crosslinks that escape paternal repair, potentially leading to chromosomal abnormalities due to maternal misrepair. Therefore, both pre- and post-fertilization DNA repair are crucial for maintaining genome integrity and preventing genetic defects in the offspring.

DNA damage in sperm has been linked to infertility, increased miscarriage risk, and conditions such as aneuploidy and structural chromosomal rearrangements. Understanding how DNA damage occurs and is repaired during spermatogenesis is important for studying male reproductive health and genetic inheritance.

== Detection ==
Chromosomal abnormalities can be detected at either postnatal testing or prenatal screening, which includes prenatal diagnosis. Early detection is crucial for enabling parents to assess their upcoming pregnancy options.Common techniques used to detect diseases resulting from chromosomal abnormalities:

- Karyotyping
- Fluorescence in situ hybridization (FISH)

Karyotyping has been the traditional method used to detect chromosomal abnormalities. It requires entire set of chromosomes to be able to identify fetal aneuploidy and variations in structural arrangements, which could be a result of insertions, inversions, duplications or deletions of chromosomes. The samples used to obtain results from fetal karyotyping can be acquired through various sampling techniques. Amongst the aneuploidy testings, those which use amniotic fluid is preferred due its benefit of having high sensitivity with relatively low risks.

For increased resolution of screening, Chromosomal Microarray Analysis (CMA) can be used which is based on comparative genomic hybridization (CGH) to identify copy number variations (CNVs). This alternative method to karyotyping reduces result uncertainty through its use of invasive fetal cell collection technique.

FISH technique detects chromosomal abnormalities through labeling of the chromosome by fluorescence using specialized probes. It is important that these probes are validated before use as they are carefully regulated by the Food and Drug Administration (FDA).

FISH is a technique used for the treatment of specific cases such as Multiple myeloma (MM) and can be used to analyze bone marrow samples to identify changes in chromosomes at a single-cell level. For the treatment of MM relapse, acquired chromosomal abnormalities such as del (17p), amp (1q) and Tetraploidy can be analyzed to guide future therapy development and updated prognosis.

Spectral Karyotyping (SKY) is a recent technology developed from the FISH technique that colors each human chromosome in a different color for identification in analysis. Through the use of fluorescent dyes such as Cy5, Texas red and spectrum green, 24 distinguishable colors can be generated using imaging spectroscopy.

Depending on the information one wants to obtain, different techniques and samples are needed.

- For the prenatal diagnosis of a fetus, amniocentesis, chorionic villus sampling, or circulating foetal cells would be collected and analysed in order to detect possible chromosomal abnormalities.
- For the preimplantational diagnosis of an embryo, a blastocyst biopsy would be performed.
- For a lymphoma or leukemia screening the technique used would be a bone marrow biopsy.

== Nomenclature ==
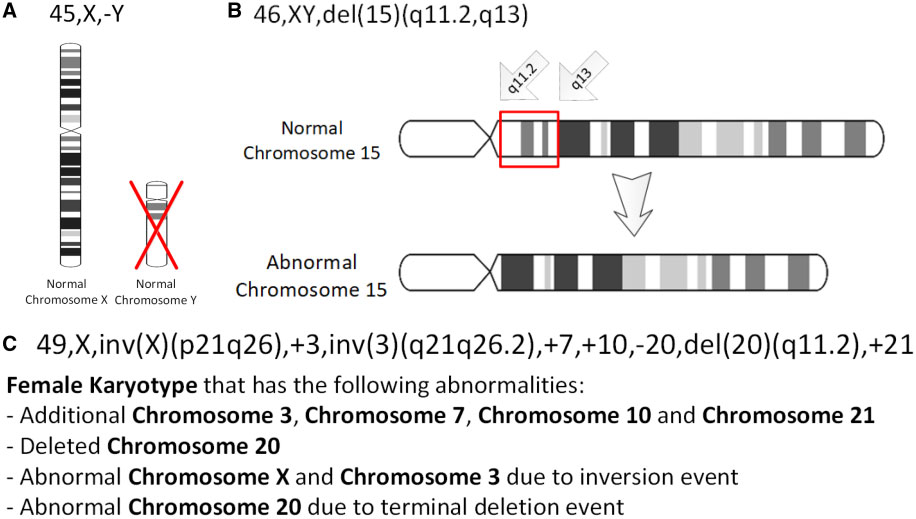
Three chromosomal abnormalities with ISCN nomenclature, with increasing complexity: (A) A tumour karyotype in a male with loss of the Y chromosome, (B) Prader–Willi Syndrome i.e. deletion in the 15q11-q12 region and (C) an arbitrary karyotype that involves a variety of autosomal and allosomal abnormalities.

Human karyotype with annotated bands and sub-bands as used for the nomenclature of chromosome abnormalities. It shows dark and white regions as seen on G banding. Each row is vertically aligned at centromere level. It shows 22 homologous autosomal chromosome pairs, both the female (XX) and male (XY) versions of the two sex chromosomes, as well as the mitochondrial genome (at bottom left).

The International System for Human Cytogenomic Nomenclature (ISCN) is an international standard for human chromosome nomenclature, which includes band names, symbols and abbreviated terms used in the description of human chromosome and chromosome abnormalities. Abbreviations include a minus sign (-) for chromosome deletions, and del for deletions of parts of a chromosome.

== See also ==
- Aneuploidy
- Chromosome segregation
- Genetic disorder
  - List of genetic disorders
- Gene therapy
- Nondisjunction
- Obstetrical complications
