= TSHZ1 =

Protein-coding gene in the species Homo sapiens

Identifiers
- Aliases: TSHZ1, CAA, NY-CO-33, SDCCAG33, TSH1, teashirt zinc finger homeobox 1
- External IDs: OMIM: 614427; MGI: 1346031; GeneCards: TSHZ1

Gene location (Human)
Chr.	Chromosome 18 (human)
Band	18q22.3	Start	75,210,755 bp
Band	18q22.3	End	75,289,950 bp

Gene location (Mouse)
Chr.	Chromosome 18 (mouse)
Band	18 E4|18 57.53 cM	Start	84,029,752 bp
Band	18 E4|18 57.53 cM	End	84,105,831 bp
RNA expression pattern
Bgee	Human / Mouse (ortholog); Top expressed in: jejunal mucosa; cerebellar vermis; mucosa of ileum; Brodmann area 23; endothelial cell; pancreatic epithelial cell; primary visual cortex; caput epididymis; middle temporal gyrus; myocardium of left ventricle / Top expressed in: Rostral migratory stream; olfactory bulb; olfactory epithelium; migratory enteric neural crest cell; cumulus cell; zygote; abdominal wall; vestibular membrane of cochlear duct; ciliary body; olfactory tubercle; More reference expression data
BioGPS	n/a
Gene ontology
Molecular function	DNA binding; metal ion binding; chromatin binding; DNA-binding transcription repressor activity, RNA polymerase II-specific; nucleic acid binding; DNA-binding transcription factor activity, RNA polymerase II-specific
Cellular component	nucleus
Biological process	soft palate development; regulation of gene expression; regulation of transcription, DNA-templated; transcription, DNA-templated; anterior/posterior pattern specification; middle ear morphogenesis; multicellular organism development; regulation of transcription by RNA polymerase II; negative regulation of transcription by RNA polymerase II
Sources:Amigo / QuickGO
Orthologs
Databases	NCBI: entry; OMA: entry
Species	Human	Mouse
Entrez	10194	110796
Ensembl	ENSG00000179981	ENSMUSG00000046982
UniProt	Q6ZSZ6	Q5DTH5
RefSeq (mRNA)	NM_001308210; NM_005786	NM_001081300; NM_001364993; NM_001364994
RefSeq (protein)	NP_001295139; NP_005777; NP_005777.3	NP_001074769; NP_001351922; NP_001351923
Location (UCSC)	Chr 18: 75.21 – 75.29 Mb	Chr 18: 84.03 – 84.11 Mb
PubMed search
- Wikidata
View/Edit Human	View/Edit Mouse

Teashirt zinc finger homeobox 1 is a protein that in humans is encoded by the TSHZ1 gene.

== Function ==
This gene encodes a colon cancer antigen that was defined by serological analysis of recombinant cDNA expression libraries. The encoded protein is a member of the teashirt C2H2-type zinc-finger protein family and may be involved in transcriptional regulation of developmental processes. Mutations in this gene may be associated with congenital aural atresia syndrome.

== In animal models ==
In addition to humans, orthologous Tshz-family genes are known to exist in several other organisms, including invertebrates like insects. Research using model organisms can be majorly beneficial in exploring the potential functionality of genes that are present in humans without requiring human testing. Additionally, by looking at gene number and function changes between organisms with differing levels of relatedness, it is possible to gain a better understanding of the gene's phylogeny, or evolutionary history. Findings related to Tshz1 orthologs in model organisms varies in scale and density of research from organism to organism.

=== In mice ===
Mice are commonly used to study Tshz1 functionality due to their closer relatedness to humans as mammals compared to other common model organisms. However, Tshz1 genes in non-model mammalian organisms have been characterized, or explored in detail, to a limited extent. The Tshz1 ortholog in the Mus musculus mouse model has been implicated in motor neuron development and craniofacial morphogenesis. Experiments involving whole gene knockout of Tshz1 during development resulted in universal lethality of M. musculus pups shortly after birth, presumably due to soft palate defects and skeletal deformities linked with Tshz1 inactivation. Mutant mice in knockout and loss of function experiments have been observed to be unable to suckle and feed, with their intestines filling up with air shortly after birth and their stomach appearing distended compared to wild type individuals. Investigations into Tshz1 impact on motor neuron development have been limited in scale, however Tshz1 mutant mice have been observed to have difficulties regulating breathing, due to decreased survival of Hypoglossal nerve and phrenic motor neurons during development.

=== In zebrafish ===
Tshz1 orthologs in Danio rerio have largely yet to be characterized, however experiments using in-situ hybridization to mark gene expression have shown that Tshz1a is most highly expressed in the spinal cord, fore-to-hindbrain, and eye during early development. Consequently, it is suspected that Tshz1a may play a role in neuron development in the brain and visual system, including the retina. Three other Tshz family genes are known to exist in Zebrafish: Tshz2, Tshz3a, and Tshz3b. A fifth gene, Tshz1b, is predicted to exist. Multiple versions of the same gene commonly exist in the Zebrafish genome, referred to as 'a' and 'b', due to an evolutionary event known as WGD (Whole Genome Duplication) in the ancestral lineage of Teleost fish, which Zebrafish belong to. The potential existence of Tshz1b is therefore contingent on whether or not the Tshz1 ortholog in the Zebrafish ancestor existed prior to the WGD event/events, and if so, whether or not Tshz1b was lost subsequently over time due to chromosome rearrangement.

=== In fruit flies ===
Drosophila melanogaster is known to possess one Tshz family gene, commonly referred to as Tsh or T Shirt, and is known to be orthologous to the Tshz gene family in humans and other vertebrates. Tsh has been found to be involved in DNA-binding activity and several aspects of development, including formation of head structures and wing hinge development. Other important processes Tsh is involved in include segmental identity, dorsal/ventral patterning, and development of the compound eye. Additionally, Tsh has been used as a test gene for creating more streamlined methods for determining the position of enhancer elements due to its large ratio of non-coding RNAs. While distantly related to humans, the presence of a Tshz-family gene in D. melanogaster suggests that this gene family originates early in the evolutionary lineage of modern-day organisms, before the divergence of vertebrate and invertebrate eukaryotes. Currently, no non-eukaryotic organisms are known to possess a Tshz-orthologous gene, but several other invertebrates, such as Bactrocera latifrons and Ceratitis capitata have known Tsh orthologs.
