= DNA ligase (NAD+) =

DNA ligase (NAD^{+})

Identifiers
- EC no.: 6.5.1.2
- CAS no.: 37259-52-2

Databases
- IntEnz: IntEnz view
- BRENDA: BRENDA entry
- ExPASy: NiceZyme view
- KEGG: KEGG entry
- MetaCyc: metabolic pathway
- PRIAM: profile
- PDB structures: RCSB PDB PDBe PDBsum
Search
- PMC: articles
- PubMed: articles
- NCBI: proteins

DNA ligase (NAD^{+}) (EC 6.5.1.2, polydeoxyribonucleotide synthase (NAD^{+}), polynucleotide ligase (NAD^{+}), DNA repair enzyme, DNA joinase, polynucleotide synthetase (nicotinamide adenine dinucleotide), deoxyribonucleic-joining enzyme, deoxyribonucleic ligase, deoxyribonucleic repair enzyme, deoxyribonucleic joinase, DNA ligase, deoxyribonucleate ligase, polynucleotide ligase, deoxyribonucleic acid ligase, polynucleotide synthetase, deoxyribonucleic acid joinase, DNA-joining enzyme, polynucleotide ligase (nicotinamide adenine dinucleotide)) is an enzyme with systematic name poly(deoxyribonucleotide):poly(deoxyribonucleotide) ligase (AMP-forming, NMN-forming). This enzyme catalyses the following chemical reaction

NAD^{+} + (deoxyribonucleotide)_{n} + (deoxyribonucleotide)_{m} $\rightleftharpoons$ AMP + beta-nicotinamide D-ribonucleotide + (deoxyribonucleotide)_{n+m}

Catalyses the formation of a phosphodiester at the site of a single-strand break in duplex DNA.

== See also ==
- DNA ligase
